This is a list of encyclopedias and encyclopedic/biographical dictionaries on general biographies in any language. Entries are in the English language except where noted.

General 
Almanac of famous people. Gale Research, Inc., 1989-. ISSN 1040-127X.

Arnim, Max, Preussische Staatsbibliothek. Internationale Personalbibliographie, 1800–1943. K.W. Hiersemann, 1944–1952.
Biographical dictionary. S9.com, 1996. Available online here.

Biography in context. Gale Group, 2002-. Available online here.
Bourne, J. M. Who's who in World War One. Routledge, 2001. .
Brennan, Elizabeth A., Elizabeth C. Clarage, Seymour Topping. Who's who of Pulitzer Prize winners. Oryx Press, 1999. .
Burnett, John, David Vincent, David Mayall. The autobiography of the working class: An annotated, critical bibliography. New York University Press, 1984–1989. .
Cannon, John Ashton. The Blackwell dictionary of historians. Blackwell Reference, 1988. .
Chambers, ed., Joan Bakewell, introduction: Chambers Biographical Dictionary, 9th edition, 2011, Chambers, 1,278 pages. . Short descriptions of 18,000 people from Britain and the rest of the world.
Cohn-Sherbok, Dan. The dictionary of Jewish biography. Oxford University Press, 2005. .
Contemporary black biography. Gale Research Inc., 1992–. ISSN 1058-1316.

Crystal, David. The Cambridge biographical encyclopedia. Cambridge University Press, 1998. .
Current biography illustrated. EBSCO Publishing. Available online here.

Encyclopedia of world biography. Gale Research, 1998-[2012]. . ISSN 1099-7326.
Europa Publications Limited. World Who's Who. Routledge, 2007-. Available online here.

Great lives from history. Salem Press, 2004–. .
Haan, Francisca de, Krasimira Daskalova, Anna Loutfi. Biographical dictionary of women's movements and feminisms in Central, Eastern, and South Eastern Europe: 19th and 20th centuries. CEU Press/Central European University Press, 2006. .
Hale, Sarah Josepha Buell, ed. Woman's record; or, Sketches of all distinguished women, from "the beginning" till A.D. 1850. Arranged in four eras. With selections from female writers of every age. New York: Harper & Brothers (1853), public domain 
Jöcher, Christian Gottlieb. Allgemeines Gelehrten-Lexicon. Johann Friedrich Gleditschens Buchhandlung, 1750–1751.
Kuehl, Warren F. Biographical dictionary of internationalists. Greenwood Press, 1983. .

Jaumann, Herbert. Handbuch gelehrtenkultur der frühen neuzeit. W. de Gruyter, 2004–2005. .

  

Kramme, U., Ž. Urra Muena. Arab-Islamic biographical archive (AIBA). K. G. Saur, 1994–2002. .
 Lazell, Barry, ed. with Dafydd Rees and Luke Crampton, Rock Movers and Shakers: An A to Z of the People Who Made Rock Happen,  Billboard Publications, Inc.,  New York,  1989
 Lorenz, Clare, Women in Architecture: a contemporary perspective,  Rizzoli,  New York,  1990
 MacKay, James,  The Dictionary of Sculptors in Bronze,  Antique Collectors Club, Woodbridge, Suffolk,  1977

Marquis biographies online. Marquis Who's Who, 1985-. Available here.
Marquis Who's Who. Who's who in the world. Marquis Who's Who, 1971-.
Marquis Who's Who. Who's who of emerging leaders. Marquis Who's Who, 2006-.

 Naylor, Colin, Contemporary Artists, St. James Press,  Chicago and London, 1989
Nobel Foundation. Nobelprize.org. Nobel Web AB. Available online here.

ProQuest obituaries. ProQuest, 1999?-. Available online here.

 Richards, J.M., ed, Adolf K. Placzek, American Consultant, Who’s Who in Architecture from 1400 to the present, Holt, Rinehart and Winston, New York,  1977
Rollyson, Carl E. Biography: An annotated bibliography. Salem Press, 1992. .
Saur Verlag, K. G. World biographical information system online. De Gruyter Saur, 2004-. Available online here.
Schellinger, Paul E. St. James guide to biography. St. James Press, 1991. .

Sherby, Louise S., Wilhelm Odelberg. The who's who of Nobel Prize winners, 1901–2000. Oryx Press, 2002. .
Slcoum, Robert B. Biographical dictionaries and related works: An international bibliography of more than 16,000 collective biographies . . . Gale Research, 1986. .
Smith, Bonnie G. The Oxford encyclopedia of women in world history. Oxford University Press, 2008.
 Televski, Nick, Knocking On Heaven’s Door: Rock Obituaries, Omnibus Press,  London  2006

Union of International Associations. Yearbook of international organizations online. Union of International Associations, 2000-. Available online here.

Vernoff, Edward, Rima Shore. The Penguin international dictionary of contemporary biography: From 1900 to the present. Penguin Reference, 2001. .
Who's who in world Jewry. Pitman, 1955–1988. ISSN 0511-9138.

Regional

Africa 
The Africa Centre. Africa contemporary database. The Africa Centre, 2001. Available online here.
African studies. Columbia University, 1999-. Available online here.
Appiah, Anthony, Henry Louis Gates. Africana: The encyclopedia of the African and African American experience. Oxford University Press, 2005. .
Cook, Chris. The making of modern Africa: A guide to archives. Facts on File, 1995. .
Julien, Charles André. Les Africains. Éditions J. A., 1977. .
Lipschutz, Mark R., R. Kent Rasmussen. Dictionary of African historical biography. University of California Press, 1986. .
Makers of modern Africa. Africa Journal for Africa Books, 1981–1996. ISSN 0261-1570.
McIlwaine, John. Africa: A guide to reference material. Hans Zell, 2007. .
Mediavilla, Victor Herrero, K. G. Saur Verlag. African biographical archive. K. G. Saur Verlag, 1994–1997. .
Núnẽz, Benjamín. Dictionary of Portuguese-African civilization. Hans Zell, 1995–1996. .
Shavit, David. The United States in Africa: A historical dictionary. Greenwood Press, 1989. .
Weidmann, Conrad. Deutsche männer in Afrika: Lexicon der hervorragensten deutschen Afrika-forscher, missionare, etc. B. Nöhring, 1894.

African islands

Canary Islands

Cape Verde

Comoros

Madagascar

Mauritius

Mayotte

Réunion

Saint Helena, Ascension Island, and Tristan de Cunha

Sao Tome and Principe

Seychelles

Central Africa 
Brockman, Norbert C. An African biographical dictionary. Grey House Publ., 2006. .
Sheldon, Kathleen E. Historical dictionary of women in sub-Saharan Africa. Scarecrow Press, 2005. .

Angola 
Núnẽz, Benjamín. Dictionary of Portuguese-African civilization. Hans Zell, 1995–1996. .

Burundi

Cameroon 
Echu, George. Who's who au Cameroun: recueil biographique des personnalités du Cameroun. Africana Publications. .

Central African Republic

Chad 
Rouvreur, Albert Le, Paule Deville, Joseph Tubiana. Eléments pour un dictionnaire biographique du Tchad et du Niger (Téda et Daza). Editions du Centre National de la Recherche Scientifique, 1978. .

Democratic Republic of the Congo 
Kindulu, Joseph-Roger Mazanza, Cornelis Nlandu-Tsasa. Les nouveaux cadres congolais: Figures d'aujourd'hui et de demain. Harmattan, 2005. .

Equatorial Guinea

Gabon

Republic of the Congo

Sao Tome and Principe

East Africa 
Brockman, Norbert C. An African biographical dictionary. Grey House Publ., 2006. .
Sheldon, Kathleen E. Historical dictionary of women in sub-Saharan Africa. Scarecrow Press, 2005. .

Burundi

Comoros 
Jérôme, Daniel Trinquet. 1000 célébrités de la Réunion et les 150 personnalités des îles de l'océan Indien. Dicorphie, 2009. . . (French).

Djibouti

Eritrea

Ethiopia

Kenya 
Who is who in Kenya. Africa Book Services, 1982–1983.

Madagascar 
Cornevin, Robert, Jacques Serre, Académie des sciences d'outre-mer. Hommes et destins: Dictionnaire biographique d'outre-mer. Académie des sciences d'outre-mer, 1975–2011. .

Malawi

Mauritius

Mayotte

Mozambique 
Ferreira, Alexandre A. Moçambique, 1489–1975. Prefácio-Edição de Livros e Revistas, Lda, [2007]. . (Portuguese)
Núnẽz, Benjamín. Dictionary of Portuguese-African civilization. Hans Zell, 1995–1996. .

Réunion 
Jérôme, Daniel Trinquet. 1000 célébrités de la Réunion et les 150 personnalités des îles de l'océan Indien. Dicorphie, 2009. . . (French).

Seychelles 
Jérôme, Daniel Trinquet. 1000 célébrités de la Réunion et les 150 personnalités des îles de l'océan Indien. Dicorphie, 2009. . . (French).
Mancham, James R. Seychelles: Personalities of yesterday. Mahe Publications, 2005. .

Somalia

South Sudan

Sudan

Tanzania

Uganda 
Who's who in Uganda. Fountain, 1994. .

Horn of Africa 
Bidwell, Robin. Arabian personalities of the early twentieth century. Oleander Press, 1986. .
Brockman, Norbert C. An African biographical dictionary. Grey House Publ., 2006. .
Sheldon, Kathleen E. Historical dictionary of women in sub-Saharan Africa. Scarecrow Press, 2005. .

Djibouti

Eritrea

Ethiopia 
Belaynesh, Michael, Stanislaw Chojnacki, Richard Pankhurst. The Dictionary of Ethiopian biography. Institute of Ethiopian Studies, Addis Ababa University, 1975–.

Somalia

North Africa 
Bidwell, Robin. Arabian personalities of the early twentieth century. Oleander Press, 1986. .
Fischbach, Michael R. Biographical encyclopedia of the modern Middle East and North Africa. Gale Group, 2008. .
Kramme, U., Z. Urra Muena. Arab-Islamic biographical archive (AIBA). K. G. Saur, 1994–2002. .

Algeria

Egypt 
David, A. Rosalie, Antony E. David. A biographical dictionary of ancient Egypt. Seaby, 1992. .

Leick, Gwendolyn. Who's who in the Ancient Near East. Routledge, 1999. .
Rice, Michael. Who's who in ancient Egypt. Routledge, 1999. .
Shimoni, Yaacov. The Biographical dictionary of the Middle East. Facts on File, 1991. .
Ummah Briss lil-Iʻlām wa-al-Nashr. Who's who in Egypt. Ummah Press Service, 1995–.

Morocco 
Who's who in Morocco. S.l.: Editions Media C.O.P.E., 1998–2001.

South Sudan

Sudan

Tunisia 
Clausen, Ursel. Tunisie: Notes biographiques. Deutsches Orient-Institut, 1976.
Zmerli, Sadok, Ḥammādī Sāḥilī. Figures tunisiennes. Dar al-Gharb al-Islami, 1993.

Southern Africa 
Brockman, Norbert C. An African biographical dictionary. Grey House Publ., 2006. .
Rosenthal, Eric. Southern African dictionary of national biography. Warne, [1966].
Sheldon, Kathleen E. Historical dictionary of women in sub-Saharan Africa. Scarecrow Press, 2005. .
Who's who of southern Africa. Who's Who of Southern Africa, 2007-. Available online here.

Angola

Botswana 
Rosenthal, Eric. Southern African dictionary of national biography. Warne, [1966].

Comoros 
Jérôme, Daniel Trinquet. 1000 célébrités de la Réunion et les 150 personnalités des îles de l'océan Indien. Dicorphie, 2009. . . (French).

Lesotho 
Rosenthal, Eric. Southern African dictionary of national biography. Warne, [1966].

Madagascar

Malawi 
M'Passou, Denis, Mary C. Piringu. Who is who of Malawi. Spot Publications, 1995. .
Rosenthal, Eric. Southern African dictionary of national biography. Warne, [1966].

Mayotte

Mozambique 
Ferreira, Alexandre A. Moçambique, 1489–1975. Prefácio-Edição de Livros e Revistas, Lda, [2007]. . (Portuguese)
Rosenthal, Eric. Southern African dictionary of national biography. Warne, [1966].

Namibia 
Rosenthal, Eric. Southern African dictionary of national biography. Warne, [1966].

Réunion 
Jérôme, Daniel Trinquet. 1000 célébrités de la Réunion et les 150 personnalités des îles de l'océan Indien. Dicorphie, 2009. . . (French).

Seychelles 
Jérôme, Daniel Trinquet. 1000 célébrités de la Réunion et les 150 personnalités des îles de l'océan Indien. Dicorphie, 2009. . . (French).

South Africa 
Brockman, Norbert C. An African biographical dictionary. Grey House Publ., 2006. .
Joyce, Peter. A concise dictionary of South African biography. Francolin, 1999. .
National Council for Social Research (South Africa). Dictionary of South African biography. Nasional Boekhandel Bpk. for National Council for Social Research, Dept. of Higher Education, 1968–1987.
Rosenthal, Eric. Southern African dictionary of national biography. Warne, [1966].

Swaziland 
Jones, Huw M. A biographical register of Swaziland to 1902. University of Natal Press, 1993. .
Rosenthal, Eric. Southern African dictionary of national biography. Warne, [1966].

Zambia 
Rosenthal, Eric. Southern African dictionary of national biography. Warne, [1966].

Zimbabwe 
Baxter, T. W., Eric Edward Burke. Guide to the historical manuscripts in the National Archives of Rhodesia. National Archives of Rhodesia, 1970.
Rosenthal, Eric. Southern African dictionary of national biography. Warne, [1966].
Taber, Edward C. Pioneers of Rhodesia. C. Struik, 1966.
Who's who in Zimbabwe. Roblaw, 1992–[1994?].

West Africa 
Sheldon, Kathleen E. Historical dictionary of women in sub-Saharan Africa. Scarecrow Press, 2005. .

Benin 
Institut de recherches appliquées du Dahomey. Dictionnaire bio-bibliographique du Dahomey. I.R.A.D., 1969. ISSN 0420-0438.

Cape Verde 
Núnẽz, Benjamín. Dictionary of Portuguese-African civilization. Hans Zell, 1995–1996. .

Gambia

Ghana

Guinea-Bissau 
Núnẽz, Benjamín. Dictionary of Portuguese-African civilization. Hans Zell, 1995–1996. .

Ivory Coast

Liberia

Mali 
Ba, Adam Konaré. Dictionnaire des femmes célèbres du Mali: Des temps mythico-légendaires au 26 mars 1991. Editions Jamana, 1993. DEWEY 920.72096623.

Mauritania

Niger 
Rouvreur, Albert Le, Paule Deville, Joseph Tubiana. Eléments pour un dictionnaire biographique du Tchad et du Niger (Téda et Daza). Editions du Centre National de la Recherche Scientifique, 1978. .

Nigeria 
Ishaka, Peter. Who's who in Nigeria. NIBC, 2003. .

Saint Helena

Sao Tome and Principe 
Núnẽz, Benjamín. Dictionary of Portuguese-African civilization. Hans Zell, 1995–1996. .

Senegal

Sierra Leone 
Who's who in Sierra Leone. Lyns Publicity, 1981.

Togo

Americas 
Appiah, Anthony, Henry Louis Gates. Africana: The encyclopedia of the African and African American experience. Oxford University Press, 2005. .
Farris, Phoebe. Women artists of color: A bio-critical sourcebook to 20th century artists in the Americas. Greenwood Press, 1999. .

Caribbean 
Contemporary Hispanic biography: profiles from the international Hispanic community. Gale, 2002–. ISSN 1541-1524.
Covington, Paula Hattox, David Block. Latin America and the Caribbean: A critical guide to research sources. Greenwood Press, 1992. .
Henderson, James D., Helen Delpar, Maurice Philip Brungardt. A reference guide to Latin American history. M. E. Sharpe, 2000. .
Marting, Diane E. Women writers of Spanish America: An annotated bio-bibliographical guide. Greenwood Press, 1987. .
Mendez Mendez, Serafín, Gail Cueto. Notable Caribbeans and Caribbean Americans: A biographical dictionary. Greenwood Press, 2003. .
Shavit, David. The United States in Latin America: A historical dictionary. Greenwood Press, 1992. .
Who's who in Latin America: Government, politics, banking and industry. Norman Ross, 1993–1997. ISSN 1068-7696.

Anguilla

Antigua and Barbuda

Aruba

Bahamas

Barbados

Bonaire

British Virgin Islands

Caribbean Netherlands

Cayman Islands

Cuba 
Alfonso, Pablo M., Partido Comunista de Cuba. Los fieles de Castro. Ediciones Cambio, 1991. .
Calcagno, Francisco. Diccionario biográfico cubano. N. Ponce de Leon, 1878–1886.
Catony, Leonardo Depestre, Luis Ubeda Garrido. Personalidades cubanas: Siglo XX. Editorial de Ciencias Sociales, 2002. .
Maratos, Daniel C., Marnesba D. Hill. Escritores de la diáspora cubana: Manual biobibliográfica or Cuban exile writers: A biobibliographic handbook. Scarecrow Press, 1986. .
Mediavilla, Victor Herrero, L. Rosa Aguayo Nayle. Archivo biográfico de España, Portugal e Iberoamérica. New York: K. G. Saur, 1990. .
Meier, Matt S., Conchita Franco Serri, Richard A. Garcia. Notable Latino Americans: A biographical dictionary. Greenwood Press, 1997. .
Sarausa, Fermín Peraza. Diccionario biográfico cubano. Ediciones Anuario Bibliográfico Cubano, 1951–1968.

Curaçao

Dominica

Dominican Republic 
Clase, Pablo. 50 biografías de figuras dominicanas. Libreros Dominicanos Unidos, 1990.
Mediavilla, Victor Herrero, L. Rosa Aguayo Nayle. Archivo biográfico de España, Portugal e Iberoamérica. New York: K. G. Saur, 1990. .
Vásquez, Pedro R. 150 dominicanos notables. Ediciones Librería La Trinitaria, 2002. .

French Antilles

Grenada

Guadeloupe

Haiti 
Pascal-Trouillot, Ertha, Ertha Trouillot. Encyclopédie biographique d'Haiti. Éditions SEMIS, 2001. .
Supplice, Daniel. Dictionnaire biographique des personnalités politiques de la République d'Haïti, 1804–2001. D. Supplice, 2001. .

Jamaica

Martinique

Montserrat

Puerto Rico 
Mediavilla, Victor Herrero, L. Rosa Aguayo Nayle. Archivo biográfico de España, Portugal e Iberoamérica. New York: K. G. Saur, 1990. .
Meier, Matt S., Conchita Franco Serri, Richard A. Garcia. Notable Latino Americans: A biographical dictionary. Greenwood Press, 1997. .
Sarramía, Tomás. Figuras de Puerto Rico: Apuntes y datos biográficos. Publicaciones Puertorriqueñas Editores, 2001. .

Saba

Saint Barthélemy

Saint Kitts and Nevis

Saint Lucia

Saint Martin

Saint Vincent and the Grenadines

Sint Eustatius

Sint Maarten

Trinidad and Tobago 
Murray, Eric John. National biography handbook of Trinidad and Tobago: With a memoir of his excellency Noor Mohamed Hassanali, T. C., president and commander-in-chief of the Republic of Trinidad and Tobago. E. J. Murray, 1996. .

Turks and Caicos Islands

U. S. Virgin Islands

Central America 
Arellano, Jorge Eduardo. Literatura centroamericana: Diccionario de autores contemporáneos; Fuentes para su estudio. Fundación Vida, 2003. .
Contemporary Hispanic biography: profiles from the international Hispanic community. Gale, 2002–. ISSN 1541-1524.
Covington, Paula Hattox, David Block. Latin America and the Caribbean: A critical guide to research sources. Greenwood Press, 1992. .
Henderson, James D., Helen Delpar, Maurice Philip Brungardt. A reference guide to Latin American history. M. E. Sharpe, 2000. .
Marting, Diane E. Women writers of Spanish America: An annotated bio-bibliographical guide. Greenwood Press, 1987. .
Shavit, David. The United States in Latin America: A historical dictionary. Greenwood Press, 1992. .
Who's who in Latin America: Government, politics, banking and industry. Norman Ross, 1993–1997. ISSN 1068-7696.

Belize

Costa Rica 
Mediavilla, Victor Herrero, L. Rosa Aguayo Nayle. Archivo biográfico de España, Portugal e Iberoamérica. New York: K. G. Saur, 1990. .
Zeledón C., Elias, Yadira Calvo Fajardo. Surcos de lucha: Libro biográfico, histórico y gráfico de la mujer costarricense. Instituto de Estudios de la Mujer, Universidad Nacional, 1997. .

Dominican Republic

El Salvador 
Mediavilla, Victor Herrero, L. Rosa Aguayo Nayle. Archivo biográfico de España, Portugal e Iberoamérica. New York: K. G. Saur, 1990. .

Guatemala 
Lima, Flavio Rojas. Diccionario histórico biográfico de Guatemala. Fundación para la Cultura y el Desarrollo, Asociación de Amigos del País, 2004. .
Mediavilla, Victor Herrero, L. Rosa Aguayo Nayle. Archivo biográfico de España, Portugal e Iberoamérica. New York: K. G. Saur, 1990. .
Yela, Carlos C. Haeussler. Diccionario general de Guatemala: Historia, geografía, bibliografía, economía, epigrafía, espeliología, iconografía, himnología, apéndice centroamericano, notas y noticias. s.n., 1983.

Honduras 
Argueta, Mario. Diccionario histórico-biográfico hondureño. Editorial Universitaria, 1990.
Mediavilla, Victor Herrero, L. Rosa Aguayo Nayle. Archivo biográfico de España, Portugal e Iberoamérica. New York: K. G. Saur, 1990. .
Ramiro, Colindres O. Enciclopedia hondureña ilustrada: De personajes históricos y figuras contemporáneos. Graficentro Editores, 1994.

Nicaragua 
Arellano, Jorge Eduardo. Héroes sin fusil. Editorial Hispamer, 1998.
Jirón, Manuel Quién es quién en Nicaragua. Ediciones Radio Amor, [1986]. .
Mediavilla, Victor Herrero, L. Rosa Aguayo Nayle. Archivo biográfico de España, Portugal e Iberoamérica. New York: K. G. Saur, 1990. .
U. S. Dept. of State, Bureau of Public Affairs. Nicaraguan biographies: A resource book. U.S. Dept. of State, Bureau of Public Affairs, [1988],

Panama 
Mediavilla, Victor Herrero, L. Rosa Aguayo Nayle. Archivo biográfico de España, Portugal e Iberoamérica. New York: K. G. Saur, 1990. .
Porras, J. Conte. Diccionario biográfico ilustrado de Panamá. Editorial Diego de Almagro, 1986.
Zentner, Federico. Nombres y apellidos de forjadores de la patria. Ministerio de Educación, República de Panamá, 1984.

North America 

Gordon, Peter, Richard Aldrich. Biographical dictionary of North American and European educationists. Woburn Press, 1997. .
 Heller, Jules and Nancy G, Heller, ed., North American Women Artists of the Twentieth Century: A Biographical Dictionary, Garland Reference Library of the Humanities (Vol. 1219), Garland Publishing Company, New York & London,  1995
Henderson, James D., Helen Delpar, Maurice Philip Brungardt. A reference guide to Latin American history. M. E. Sharpe, 2000. .

Canada 

Ash, Lee, Bernhard A. Uhlendorf, Council of National Library Associations. A biographical directory of librarians in the United States and Canada. American Library Association, 1970. .
Baillie, Laureen. Canadian biographical archive. K. G. Saur Verlag, 2001–2003. .
Canadian Dictionary of Biography (online)
Canadian who's who. Musson Book co., 1910.
The Canadian who's who: a biographical dictionary of notable living men and women. Toronto: University of Toronto Press, 1910–. ISSN 0068-9963. Available online here.
Cook, Ramsay, Réal Bélanger, Library and Archives Canada, Université Laval, University of Toronto. Dictionary of Canadian biography online. Library and Archives Canada; Université Laval; University of Toronto, 2003-. Available online here.
Dale, Doris Cruger. A directory of oral history tapes of librarians in the United States and Canada. American Library Association, 1986. .
Kelly, Howard A., Walter L. Burrage. Dictionary of American medical biography: Lives of eminent physicians of the United States and Canada, from the earliest times. London: D. Appleton and Co., 1928.

Wallace, W. Stewart, William Angus McKay. The Macmillan dictionary of Canadian biography. Macmillan of Canada, 1978. .

Mexico 
Camp, Roderic A. Mexican political biographies: 1884–1935. University of Texas Press, 1991. .
Camp, Roderic Ai. Who's who in Mexico today. Westview Press, 1993. .
Contemporary Hispanic biography: profiles from the international Hispanic community. Gale, 2002–. ISSN 1541-1524.
Covington, Paula Hattox, David Block. Latin America and the Caribbean: A critical guide to research sources. Greenwood Press, 1992. .
Diccionario Porrúa de historia, biografía y geografía de México. Editorial Porrúa, 1995. .
Gómez, Vázquez Juana. Dictionary of Mexican rulers, 1325–1997. Greenwood Press, 1997. .
Granados, Rafael García. Diccionario biográfico de historia antigua de Méjico. Instituto de Historia, 1955.
Marting, Diane E. Women writers of Spanish America: An annotated bio-bibliographical guide. Greenwood Press, 1987. .
Mediavilla, Victor Herrero, L. Rosa Aguayo Nayle. Archivo biográfico de España, Portugal e Iberoamérica. New York: K. G. Saur, 1990. .
Meier, Matt S., Conchita Franco Serri, Richard A. Garcia. Notable Latino Americans: A biographical dictionary. Greenwood Press, 1997. .
Musacchio, Humberto. Quién es quién en la política mexicana: Diccionario. Plaza Janés, 2002. .
Sierra, Carlos J. Diccionario biográfico de Campeche. Ediciones de la Muralla, 1997. .

Tovar, Aurora. Mil quinientas mujeres en nuestra conciencia colectiva: Catálogo biográfico de mujeres de México. Documentación y Estudio de Mujeres, 1996. .

United States 

Adamson, Lynda G. Notable women in American history: A guide to recommended biographies and autobiographies. Greenwood Press, 1999. .
African American biographical database (AABD). ProQuest Information and Learning Company, 2001–. Available here.

American Council of Learned Societies. Dictionary of American biography. Scribner, 1928–1996.
American Council of Learned Societies. American national biography online. Oxford University Press, 2000-. Available online here.
Ash, Lee, Bernhard A. Uhlendorf, Council of National Library Associations. A biographical directory of librarians in the United States and Canada. American Library Association, 1970. .
Ashley, Perry J. American newspaper journalists, 1873–1900. Gale Research, 1983. .
Ahsley, Perry J. American newspaper publishers, 1950–1990. Gale Research, 1993. .
Bailey, Martha J. American women in science: 1950 to the present: a biographical dictionary. ABC-CLIO, 1998. .

Bowman, John Stewart. The Cambridge dictionary of American biography. Cambridge University Press, 1995. .

Cannon, John, Frank Robinson. Biography database: 1680–1830. Romulus Press, 1995–2000.

Clinton, Catherine, Christine A. Lunardini. The Columbia guide to American women in the nineteenth century. Columbia University Press, 2000. .
Congressional Medal of Honor Society. Congressional Medal of Honor Society. Available online here.
Congressional Yellow Book Leadership Connect, Inc., 1975-.
Contemporary black biography. Gale Research Inc., 1992–. ISSN 1058-1316.
Contemporary Hispanic biography: profiles from the international Hispanic community. Gale, 2002–. ISSN 1541-1524.
Contemporary theatre, film, and television. Gale Research, 1984–. ISSN 0749-064X.
Cross, Mary. 100 people who changed 20th-century America. ABC-CLIO, 2013. .
 Cummings, Paul, Dictionary of Contemporary American Artists, St. Martin's Press, New York,  1977
Dale, Doris Cruger. A directory of oral history tapes of librarians in the United States and Canada. American Library Association, 1986. .
Dematteis, Philip Breed, Leemon B. McHenry. American philosophers, 1950–2000. Gale Group, 2003. .

Dictionary of American Biography. Scribner's, 1928-.
Dictionary of North Carolina Biography. University of North Carolina Press. available here.
DuPree, Sherry Sherrod. Biographical dictionary of African-American, Holiness-Pentecostals, 1880–1990. Middle Atlantic Regional Press, 1989. .
 Falk, Peter Hastings, Who Was Who in American Art, Sound View Press, Madison Connecticut,  1985
Federal Yellow Book Leadership Connect, Inc., 1986-.
Foner, Eric. Freedom's lawmakers: A directory of black officeholders during Reconstruction. Louisiana State University Press, 1996. .
Gore, James Howard. American members of foreign orders. W. F. Roberts, 1910.
Grimm, Robert T. Notable American philanthropists: Biographies of giving and volunteering. Greenwood Press, 2002. .
Günümüz Türkiyesinde kim kimdir (Who's who in Turkey.) Profesyonel, 1986–2002?.
Hafner, Arthur Wayne, Fred W. Hunter, B. Michael Tarpey. Directory of deceased American physicians, 1804–1929: A genealogical guide to over 149,000 medical practitioners providing brief biographical sketches drawn from the American Medical Association's Deceased Physician Masterfile. American Medical Association, c1993. .
Hamilton, Neil A. American business leaders: From colonial times to the present. ABC-CLIO, 1999. .

Hyman, Paula, Deborah Dash Moore, Phyllis Holman Weisbard. Jewish women in America: An historical encyclopedia. Routledge, 1997. .
IFILM. Film directors: A complete guide. Lone Eagle, 1984–. ISSN 0740-2872.

James, Edward T., Janet Wilson James, Paul S. Boyer. Notable American Women, 1607–1950: A Biographical Dictionary. Belknap Press of Harvard University Press, 1971. .
Kaufman, Martin, Joellen Watson Hawkins, Loretta P. Higgins, Alice Howell Friedman. Dictionary of American nursing biography. Greenwood Press, 1988. .
Kelly, Howard A., Walter L. Burrage. Dictionary of American medical biography: Lives of eminent physicians of the United States and Canada, from the earliest times. London: D. Appleton and Co., 1928.
Krul, Arthur J. American literary journalists, 1945–1995. Gale Research, 1997. .
Leadership Connect. Leadership Connect, Inc., 2002-. Available online here.
Leonard, John W. Who's who in New York city and state. Hamersly, 1909.
Litoff, Judy Barrett, Judith McDonnell. European immigrant women in the United States: A biographical dictionary. Garland Publ., 1994. .
Marcus, Jacob Rader, Judith M. Daniels. The concise dictionary of American Jewish biography. Carlson Publ., 1994. .
Marquis, Albert Nelson. Who's Who in America. Marquis, 1899-. ISSN 0083-9396.
Marquis Who's Who. Who's who of American women. Marquis Who's Who, 1958-.
Marquis Who's Who. Who was who in America. Marquis Who's Who, 1943-. ISSN 0146-8081.
Marquis Who's Who. Who's who among human services professionals. Marquis Who's Who, 1986-.
Marquis Who's Who. Who's who in 20th century America. Marquis Who's Who, 2000.
McKerns, Joseph P. Biographical dictionary of American journalism. Greenwood Press, 1989. .
Men and women of America. Hamersley, 1910.
Meyer, George H., George H. Meyer, Jr., Katherine P. White, Museum of American Folk Art. Folk artists biographical index. Gale Research, 1987. .
Monroe, Dan, Bruce Tap. Shapers of the great debate on the Civil War: A biographical dictionary. Greenwood Press, 2005. .
Muccigrosso, Robert, and Suzanne Niemeyer. Research guide to American historical biography. Beacham, 1988–1992. .

 Opitz, Glenn B, Editor, Mantle Fielding's Dictionary of American Painters, Sculptors & Engravers, Apollo Book, Poughkeepsie NY, 1986
Peel, Albert. The Congregational two hundred, 1530–1948. Independent Press, [1948].
Polner, Murray. American Jewish biographies. Facts on File, [1982]. .

Purcell, L. Edward. Who was who in the American Revolution. Facts on File, 1993. .
Riley, Sam G. American magazine journalists, 1741–1850. Gale Research, 1988. .
Riley, Sam. G. Biographical dictionary of American newspaper columnists. Greenwood Press, 1995. .
Ritter, Charles F., Jon L. Wakelyn. Leaders of the American Civil War: A biographical and historiographical dictionary. Greenwood Press, 1998. .
Roberts, Nancy L. American peace writers, editors, and periodicals: A dictionary. Greenwood Press, 1991. .
Roysdon, Christine, Linda A. Khatri. American engineers of the nineteenth century: A biographical index. Garland, 1978. .

Sammons, Vivian O. Blacks in science and medicine. Hemisphere, 1990. .
Seller, Maxine. Women educators in the United States, 1820–1993: A bio-bibliographical sourcebook. Greenwood Press, 1994. .
Shavit, David. The United States in Latin America: A historical dictionary. Greenwood Press, 1992. .
Shearer, Benjamin F. Home front heroes: A biographical dictionary of Americans during wartime. Greenwood Press, 2007. .

Sickels, Robert. 100 entertainers who changed America: an encyclopedia of pop culture luminaries. Greenwood, 2013. .
Smith, Ben A., James W. Vining. American geographers, 1784–1812: A bio-bibliographical guide. Praeger, 2003. .
Sporting News. Baseball register. Sporting News, 1940–. ISSN 0162-542X.

Taft, William H. Encyclopedia of twentieth-century journalists. Garland, 1986. .
Thrapp, Dan L. Encyclopedia of frontier biography. A. H. Clark, 1988–1994. .
Todd, Janet M. A dictionary of British and American women writers, 1660–1800. Rowman and Allanheld, 1985. .
Utter, Glenn H., Charles Lockhart, Robert Jervis. American political scientists: A dictionary. Greenwood Press, 2002. .
Wakelyn, Jon L. Birth of the Bill of Rights: Encyclopedia of the Antifederalists. Greenwood Press, 2004. .
Waldman, Carl. Biographical dictionary of American Indian history to 1900. Facts on File, 2001. .
White, James Terry. National cyclopaedia of American biography. J. T. White, 1892–1984.
Who's who among Hispanic Americans. Gale Research, 1991–1994. ISSN 1052-7354.

Who's who in the Northwest. Western Press association, 1910.

Witzel, Morgen. The encyclopedia of the history of American management. Thoemmes Continuum, 2005. .
Wright, John D. The Routledge encyclopedia of Civil War era biographies. Routledge, 2013. .
Zia, Helen, Susan B. Gall, George Takei. Notable Asian Americans. Gale Research, 1995. .

Eastern United States 
Marquis Who's Who. Who's who the East. Marquis Who's Who, 1943-.

New England 
Marquis Who's Who. Who's who in New England. Marquis Who's Who, 1909–1949.

Midwestern United States 

 Bentley, Helms and Rospond, Artists in Michigan 1900–1976: A Biographical Dictionary,  Introduction by Dennis Barrie, Wayne State University Press, Detroit, 1989
 Gibson, Arthur Hopkin, Artists of Early Michigan: A Biographical Dictionary of Artists Native to or Active in Michigan, 1701–1900, Wayne State University Press, Detroit, 1975
Marquis Who's Who. Who's Who in the Midwest or Who's Who in the central states. Marquis Who's Who, 1947-.

Southern and Southwestern United States 

Marquis Who's Who. Who's who in the south and southwest. Marquis Who's Who, 1947-.
 Ortega, Pach, Cook et al., New Mexico Artists, University of New Mexico, Albuquerque  1952

Western United States 
Marquis Who's Who. Who's who in the West or Who's Who on the Pacific coast. Marquis Who's Who, 1947-.

South America 
Contemporary Hispanic biography: profiles from the international Hispanic community. Gale, 2002–. ISSN 1541-1524.
Covington, Paula Hattox, David Block. Latin America and the Caribbean: A critical guide to research sources. Greenwood Press, 1992. .
Henderson, James D., Helen Delpar, Maurice Philip Brungardt. A reference guide to Latin American history. M. E. Sharpe, 2000. .
Marting, Diane E. Women writers of Spanish America: An annotated bio-bibliographical guide. Greenwood Press, 1987. .
Shavit, David. The United States in Latin America: A historical dictionary. Greenwood Press, 1992. .
Who's who in Latin America: Government, politics, banking and industry. Norman Ross, 1993–1997. ISSN 1068-7696.

Argentina 
Argento, Analía and Ana Gerschenson1. Quién es quién en la política argentina. Libros Perfil, 1999. .
Chávez, Fermin, Roberto Vilchez, Enrique Manson, Lorenzo González. Diccionario histórico argentino. Ediciones Fabro, 2005. .
Cutolo, Vicente Osvaldo. Nuevo diccionario biográfico argentino, 1750–1930. Editorial Elche, 1968–1985.
Cutolo, Vicente Osvaldo, Federico Pergola. Novisimo diccionario biografico argentino, 1930–1980. Editorial Elche, 2004–.
Galasso, Norberto. Los malditos: hombres y mujeres excluídos de la historia oficial de los argentinos. Ediciones Madres de Plaza de Mayo, 2005–2009.
Mediavilla, Victor Herrero, L. Rosa Aguayo Nayle. Archivo biográfico de España, Portugal e Iberoamérica. New York: K. G. Saur, 1990. .

Publicaciones Referenciales Latinoamericanas. Quién es quién en América del Sur. Publicaciones Referenciales Latinoamericanas, 1982–.
Udaondo, Enrique, Gregorio Araoz Alfaro. Diccionario biográfico colonial argentino. Editorial Huarpes, 1945.

Bolivia 
Arze, José Roberto. Diccionario biográfico boliviano. Editorial Los Amigos del Libro, 1984–[1996]. .
Canedo, Benjamín Hinojosa. Quienes somos: Quién es quién en Bolivia. Secretaría Nacional de Cultura, [1999].
Editores Quién es Quién en Bolivia. Quién es quién en Bolivia 2003. Editores Quién es Quién en Bolivia, [2003].
Mediavilla, Victor Herrero, L. Rosa Aguayo Nayle. Archivo biográfico de España, Portugal e Iberoamérica. New York: K. G. Saur, 1990. .
Romecin, Edmundo Montenegro. Diccionario biográfico de personalidades en Bolivia. La Paz, Bolivia: s.n., 1999–. ISSN 0419-0998.

Brazil 
Abreu, Alzira Alves de. Dicionário histórico-biográfico da Primeira República: 1889–1930. Centro de Pesquisa e Documentação de História Contemporânea do Brasil. (Portuguese). Available online here.
Abreu, Alzira Alves de. Dicionário histórico-biográfico brasileiro, pós-1930. FGV Editora: FGV CPDOC, 2001. .
Bruno, Adriana. Quem é quem na história do Brasil. Abril Multimídia, 2000. . (Portuguese).
Mediavilla, Victor Herrero, L. Rosa Aguayo Nayle. Archivo biográfico de España, Portugal e Iberoamérica. New York: K. G. Saur, 1990. .
Paule, Christiane Jalles de, Fernando Lattman-Weltman. Dicionario historico-biografico brasileiro, pos-1930.. Centro de Pesquisa e Documentação de História Contemporânea do Brasil. Also available online as Dicionario historico-biografico brasileiro. here.
Schumaher, Schuma, Erico Vital Brazil. Dicionário mulheres do Brasil: De 1500 até a atualidade; Com 270 ilustrações. J. Zahar Editor, 2000. .
Tapajós, Vicente Costa Santos, Instituto Histórico e Geográfico Brasileiro. Dicionário biobibliográfico de historiadores, geógrafos e antropólogos brasileiros. Instituto Histórico e Geográfico Brasileiro, 1991–1998.

Chile 
Céspedes, Mario, Lelia Garreaud. Gran diccionario de Chile: Biográfico-cultural. Importadora Alfa, 1988.
Diccionario biográfico de Chile. Empresa Periodística Chile, 1936–1986.
Infante, Fernando Castillo, Lía Cortés, Jordi Fuentes. Diccionario histórico y biográfico de Chile. Zig-Zag, 1999. .

Mediavilla, Victor Herrero, L. Rosa Aguayo Nayle. Archivo biográfico de España, Portugal e Iberoamérica. New York: K. G. Saur, 1990. .

Colombia 
Gómez Pérez, Fernando, Jaime Gómez Pérez. 300 colombianos de todas las épocas. Próyex Editores, 2002. .
González Toledo, Felipe. Quién es quién en Colombia, 1978: Biografías contemporáneas. Editorial Temis Librería, 1978. .
Mediavilla, Victor Herrero, L. Rosa Aguayo Nayle. Archivo biográfico de España, Portugal e Iberoamérica. New York: K. G. Saur, 1990. .
Ospina, Joaquín. Diccionario biográfico y bibliográfico de Colombia. Editorial de Cromos, 1927–39.
Perozzo, Carlos, Renán Flórez, Eugenio de Bustos Tovar. Forjadores de Colombia contemporánea: Los 81 personajes que más han influido en la formación de nuestro país. Planeta, 1986. .

Ecuador 
Alarcón Costta, César (2000), Diccionario Biográfico Ecuatoriano, Quito, Ecuador, Ediciones La Tierra, 1,273 pages. . 
Costta, César Alarcón. Diccionario biográfico ecuatoriano. Fundación Ecuatoriana de Desarrollo; Editorial Raíces, 2000. .
Mediavilla, Victor Herrero, L. Rosa Aguayo Nayle. Archivo biográfico de España, Portugal e Iberoamérica. New York: K. G. Saur, 1990. .
Noboa, Fernando Jurado. Diccionario histórico genealógico de apellidos y familias de origen quechua, aymara y araucano (Ecuador). Temístocles Hernández, 2002. .
Pimentel, Rodolfo Pérez. Diccionario biográfico del Ecuador. Litografía e Imprenta de la Universidad de Guayaquil, 1987–.
Pimentel, Rodolfo Pérez (2001): Diccionario biográfico del Ecuador, Guayaquil, Ecuador : Litografía e Imp. de la Universidad de Guayaquil, Vol 1 to 22. Free access to all volumes (1,600 articles) online.

Falkland Islands 
Tatham, David. The dictionary of Falklands biography (including South Georgia): from discovery up to 1981. D. Tatham, 2008.

French Guiana

Guyana 
Seymour, Arthur J., Elma Seymour. Dictionary of Guyanese biography. [s.n.], 1985–1986.

Paraguay 
Amaral, Raúl. Forjadores del Paraguay: Diccionario biográfico. Distribuidora Quevedo de Ediciones, 2000. .
Cardozo, Lisandro. Diccionario de las artes visuales del Paraguay. L. Cardozo, [2005]. .
Mediavilla, Victor Herrero, L. Rosa Aguayo Nayle. Archivo biográfico de España, Portugal e Iberoamérica. New York: K. G. Saur, 1990. .
Quién es quién en el Paraguay?. Editorial F. Monte Domecq, v.1-16; 1941–2005.
Verón, Luis. Enciclopedia biográfica paraguaya del bicentenario. Álvaro Ayala Producciones: Itaipu Binacional: Centro Cultural de la República Cabildo, 2009.

Peru 
Batres, Carlos Milla. Diccionario histórico y biográfico del Perú, siglos XV–XX. Editorial Milla Batres, 1986. .
Mediavilla, Victor Herrero, L. Rosa Aguayo Nayle. Archivo biográfico de España, Portugal e Iberoamérica. New York: K. G. Saur, 1990. .

Requejo, Juan Vicente. Quién es quién en el Perú. Centro de Documentación Andina, [1990].
Seviliano, Alfonso Cueva. Diccionario histórico biográfico: Peruanos ilustres. A.F.A. Editores Importadores, 2004.

Suriname

Uruguay 
Campodónico, Miguel Angel. Nuevo diccionario de la cultura uruguaya: Sepa quién es quién en artes visuales, música, cine y video, teatro, letras y periodismo. Linardi y Risso, 2003. .
Castiglioni, Efrain Mannise, Jacobo Swier Grafner. Quién es quién en el Uruguay. Promociones y Ediciones Panamericana, 1997.
Fraire, Osvaldo A. Diccionario biográfico de la mujer en el Uruguay. s.l.: s.n., 1999.
Mediavilla, Victor Herrero, L. Rosa Aguayo Nayle. Archivo biográfico de España, Portugal e Iberoamérica. New York: K. G. Saur, 1990. .
Rela, Walter. Personalidades de la cultura en el Uruguay: Humanistas y científicos. Ediciones de la Plaza, 2001. .
Saldaña, José María Fernández. Diccionario uruguayo de biografías, 1810–1940. Editorial Amerindia, 1945.

Venezuela 
Dugarte, Rafael Angel Rivas, Gladys García Riera, Francisco Javier Pérez. Quiénes escriben en Venezuela: Diccionario de escritores venezolanos; Siglos XVIII a XXI. Caracas [Venezuela], 2006.
Galería de Arte Nacional (Venezuela). Diccionario biográfico de las artes visuales en Venezuela. Fundación Galería de Arte Nacional, 2005. .
Mediavilla, Victor Herrero, L. Rosa Aguayo Nayle. Archivo biográfico de España, Portugal e Iberoamérica. New York: K. G. Saur, 1990. .
Montañés, Ismael Silva. Hombres y mujeres del siglo XVI venezolano. Academia Nacional de la Historia, 1983.
Parilli, Jorge Maldonado. Gente de Venezuela: 500 años, 585 venezolanos. M. A. García, 1992.
Quién es quién en Venezuela. Editorial Quiénes Somos en Venezuela, 1988–.
Venezuela Tuya (2012), Biografías de Venezuela, online database of Venezuelan biographies, classified by area of interest and also alphabetically. No print edition.

Asia 
Marquis Who's Who. Who's who in Asia. Marquis Who's Who, 2007-. ISSN 1930-1227.

Central Asia 
Thiébaud, Jean-Marie. Personnages marquants d'Asie centrale, du Turkestan et de l'Ouzbekistan: Dictionnaire biographique. Harmattan, 2004. .

Afghanistan 
Adamec, Ludwig W. Biographical encyclopedia of Afghanistan. Pentagon Press, 2008. ; .
Adamec, Ludwig W. Historical and political who's who of Afghanistan. Akademische Druck-u. Verlagsanstalt, 1975. .

Kazakhstan 
Geron, Leonard, Alex Pravda. Who's who in Russia and the new states. I. B. Tauris, 1993. .

Kyrgyzstan 
Geron, Leonard, Alex Pravda. Who's who in Russia and the new states. I. B. Tauris, 1993. .

Tajikistan 
Geron, Leonard, Alex Pravda. Who's who in Russia and the new states. I. B. Tauris, 1993. .

Turkmenistan 
Geron, Leonard, Alex Pravda. Who's who in Russia and the new states. I. B. Tauris, 1993. .

Uzbekistan 
Geron, Leonard, Alex Pravda. Who's who in Russia and the new states. I. B. Tauris, 1993. .
Thiébaud, Jean-Marie. Personnages marquants d'Asie centrale, du Turkestan et de l'Ouzbekistan: Dictionnaire biographique. Harmattan, 2004. .

East Asia

China 
Bartke, Wolfgang. Who's who in the People's Republic of China. K. G. Saur, [1981–1991]. .
 Online at Internet Archive.
Antoine Brébion, Antoine Cabaton. Dictionnaire de bio-bibliographie générale, ancienne et moderne de l'Indochine française. Société d'Éditions Géographiques, Maritimes et Coloniales, 1935.
Brown, Kerry. Berkshire dictionary of Chinese biography. Berkshire Publishing Group, 2014. .
Cavanaugh, Jerome. Who's who in China, 1918–1950: With an index. Chinese Materials Center, 1982. .
China vitae. China Vitae, Wen Wei Publ. Co. Ltd., 2003-. Available online here.
De Crespigny, Rafe. A biographical dictionary of Later Han to the Three Kingdoms (23–220 AD). Brill, 2007. .
Fairbank Center for Chinese Studies. China Biographical Database Project. Harvard College. Available online here.
Franke, Herbert. Sung biographies.`Steiner, 1976. .

Goldfiem, Jacques de. Personnalités chinoises d'aujourd'hui. L'Harmattan, 1989. . (French).
Goodman, David S. G. China's provincial leaders, 1949–1985. Humanities Press, 1986–. .

Hummel, Arthur W. Eminent Chinese of the Chʻing Period (1644–1912). U.S. Govt. Print. Off., 1943–1944; various reprints.
Klein, Donald W., Anne B. Clark. Biographic dictionary of Chinese communism, 1921–1965. Harvard University Press, 1971. .

Lecher, Hanno E. Internet guide for Chinese studies. Sinological Institute, Leiden University, 1995–. Available here.
Lee, Lily Xiao Hong, A. D. Stefanowska, Sue Wiles. Biographical dictionary of Chinese women. M. E. Sharpe, 1998–2007. .
Loewe, Michael. A biographical dictionary of the Qin, former Han and Xin periods, 221 BC–AD 24. Brill, 2000. .
Minden, Stephan von. Chinese biographical archive (CBA) (Chinesisches biographisches archiv.), K. G. Saur, 1996–1999. .
Song, Yuwu. Biographical dictionary of the People's Republic of China. McFarland & Company, Inc., Publishers, 2013.

Who's who in China. Who's Who in Italy, 2006. Available online here.

Hong Kong 
Holdsworth, May, Christopher Munn. Dictionary of Hong Kong biography. Hong Kong University Press, 2012. .

Macau 
Mediavilla, Victor Herrero, L. Rosa Aguayo Nayle. Archivo biográfico de España, Portugal e Iberoamérica. New York: K. G. Saur, 1990. .

Japan 

Gessel, Van C. Japanese fiction writers, 1868–1945. Gale Research, 1997. .
International Culture Institute (Hong Kong). Who's who in Japan. International Culture Institute, 1984–1991.
Iwao, Seiichi, Burton Watson. Biographical dictionary of Japanese history. International Society for Educational Information, 1978. .
Japan Biographical Research Dept. The Japan biographical encyclopedia and who's who. Rengo Press, 1958–1965.

Nichigani Associates. whoplus = Nichigai Asoshietsu Jinbutsu bunken joho. Nichigai Asoshietsu, 2001. available online here.

Wispelwey, Berend. Japanese biographical archive (JBA). K. G. Saur Verlag, 2000–2003. . (Japanese, English, French, German, and other European languages).

Mongolia

North Korea 
Frey, Axel. Korean biographical archive (KBA). K. G. Saur, 2000–2004. . (Korean, English, French, German, and Russian).
Korea annual. Hapdong News Agency, 1964–2004. ISSN 1225-0147.

Republic of China 
Ontess, Harold M. One thousand westerners in Taiwan to 1945: A biographical and bibliographical dictionary. Institute of Taiwan History, Preparatory Office, Academic Sinica, 1999. .
Who's who in the Republic of China, Taiwan. Government Information Office, [2001– ].
Zhaowei Zhang. Zhonghua min guo xian dai ming ren lu. Zhongguo min ren zhuan ji zhong xin, 1998. .

South Korea 
Frey, Axel. Korean biographical archive (KBA). K. G. Saur, 2000–2004. . (Korean, English, French, German, and Russian).
Korea annual. Hapdong News Agency, 1964–2004. ISSN 1225-0147.

North Asia

Russia/Soviet Union 

Chuvakov, V. N. Nezabytye mogily: Rossiĭskoe zarubezhʹe: Nekrologi 1917–1997: V shesti tomakh. Rossiĭskaia͡ gos. biblioteka, 1999–. .
de Boer, S. P., E. J. Driessen, H. L. Verhaar, Universiteit van Amsterdam. Biographical dictionary of dissidents in the Soviet Union, 1956–1975. M. Nijhoff, 1982. .
Frey, Axel, K. G. Saur Verlag. Biographisches archiv der Sowjetunion (1917–1991). K. G. Saur Verlag, 2000–2003. .
Frey, Axel, K. G. Saur Verlag. Russisches biographisches archiv. K. G. Saur Verlag, 1997–2000. . (English, French, German, Russian).
Geron, Leonard, Alex Pravda. Who's who in Russia and the new states. I. B. Tauris, 1993. .
Hoover Institution on War, Revolution, and Peace., RFE-RL, inc. The Soviet biographic archive, 1954–1985. Chadwyck-Healey, 1986.
Institut zur Erforschung der UdSSR. Prominent personalities in the USSR. Scarecrow Press, 1968. ISSN 0555-4632.
Kallinikov, Pavel. Russkii biograficheskii slovar. Pavel Kallinikov, 1997-. Available here.
Kaufman, Isaak Mikhaĭlovich. Russkie biograficheskie i biobibliograficheskie slovari. Gos. izd-vo kul'turno-prosvetitel'noi lit-ry, 1955.
Lewytzkyi, Dorys. Who's who in the Soviet Union: A biographical encyclopedia of 5,000 leading personalities in the Soviet Union. K. G. Saur Verlag, 1984. .

Polovtsov, Aleksandr Aleksandrovich, B. L. Modzalevskiĭ, M. G Kurd. Russkīĭ bīograficheskīĭ slovar. Tipografiia I.N. Slorokholova [etc.], 1896–1918.
Schulz-Torge, Ulrich-Joachim. Who was who in the Soviet Union: A biographical dictionary of more than 4,600 leading officials from the central apparatus and the republics to 1991. K. G. Saur, 1992. .
Soviet biographical service. J. L. Scherer, 1985–2002.
Sov. ėnts͡iklopediia͡. Deia͡teli SSSR i revoliu͡ts͡ionnogo dvizheniia͡ Rossii: Ents͡iklopedicheskiĭ slovarʹ Granat. Sov. ėnts͡iklopediia͡, 1989. .
Who's Who Strategic Area. Who's who in Russia. Who's Who Strategic Area, 1998–2007. Available online here.
Zealesskiĭ, K. A. Kto estʹ kto v istorii SSSR: 1953–1991. Veche, 2010. .

South Asia

Afghanistan 
Scholberg, Henry. The biographical dictionary of greater India. Promilla, 1998. .

Bangladesh 
Baillie, Laureen, K. G. Saur Verlag. Indian biographical archive. K. G. Saur Verlag, 1997–2000. .
Śamasujjāmāna, Ābula Phajala. Who's who in Bangladesh art, culture, literature, 1901–1991. Tribhuj Prakashani, 1992.
Scholberg, Henry. The biographical dictionary of greater India. Promilla, 1998. .
Singh, Nagendra Kr. Encyclopaedia of Muslim biography: India, Pakistan, Bangladesh. A. P. H., 2001. .
Who's who in Bangladesh. Times Publications, 1982–1984.
Who's who in Bangladesh, 2000. Manu Islam Centre for Bangladesh Culture, 2001.

Bhutan

India 
Baillie, Laureen, K. G. Saur Verlag. Indian biographical archive. K. G. Saur Verlag, 1997–2000. .

India who's who. INFA Publications, 1969–. ISSN 0073-6244.
Indian Bibliographic Centre. Dictionary of Indian biography. Indian Bibliographic Centre, 2000. .
Riddick, John F. Who was who in British India. Greenwood Press, 1998. .
Scholberg, Henry. The biographical dictionary of greater India. Promilla, 1998. .
Sen, Siba Pada. Dictionary of national biography. Institute of Historical Studies, 1972–1974.
Singh, Nagendra Kr. Encyclopaedia of Muslim biography: India, Pakistan, Bangladesh. A. P. H., 2001. .

Maldives

Nepal 
Research Centre for Communication and Development (Kathmandu, Nepal). Nepal who's who. Research Centre for Communication and Development, 1997–2003.
Scholberg, Henry. The biographical dictionary of greater India. Promilla, 1998. .

Pakistan 
Baillie, Laureen, K. G. Saur Verlag. Indian biographical archive. K. G. Saur Verlag, 1997–2000. .
Research Institute of Historiography, Biography and Philosophy. Biographical encyclopedia of Pakistan. Research Institute of Historiography, Biography and Philosophy, 1956–. ISSN 0067-8732.
Scholberg, Henry. The biographical dictionary of greater India. Promilla, 1998. .
Singh, Nagendra Kr. Encyclopaedia of Muslim biography: India, Pakistan, Bangladesh. A. P. H., 2001. .

Sri Lanka 
Baillie, Laureen, K. G. Saur Verlag. Indian biographical archive. K. G. Saur Verlag, 1997–2000. .
Scholberg, Henry. The biographical dictionary of greater India. Promilla, 1998. .

Wimalaratne, K. D. G. Personalities, Sri Lanka: A biographical study (15th–20th century), 1490–1990 A.D., A–Z. Ceylon Business Appliances, 1994. .

Southeast Asia 
Wispelwey, Berend. South-East Asian biographical archive. K. G. Saur, 1997–2000. .

Brunei 
Horton, A. V. M. A biographical dictionary of Negara Brunei Darussalam, 1841–1998. A. V. M. Horton, 1999. .
Wispelwey, Berend. South-East Asian biographical archive. K. G. Saur, 1997–2000. .

Cambodia 
Brébion, Antoine, Antoine Cabaton. Dictionnaire de bio-bibliographie générale, ancienne et moderne de l'Indochine française. Société d'Éditions Géographiques, Maritimes et Coloniales, 1935.
Jennar, Raoul Marc, Jean Lacouture. Les clés du Cambodge. Maisonneuve et Larose, 1995. .
Wispelwey, Berend. South-East Asian biographical archive. K. G. Saur, 1997–2000. .

East Timor 
Wispelwey, Berend. South-East Asian biographical archive. K. G. Saur, 1997–2000. .

Indonesia 
Wispelwey, Berend. South-East Asian biographical archive. K. G. Saur, 1997–2000. .

Laos 
Brébion, Antoine, Antoine Cabaton. Dictionnaire de bio-bibliographie générale, ancienne et moderne de l'Indochine française. Société d'Éditions Géographiques, Maritimes et Coloniales, 1935.
Wispelwey, Berend. South-East Asian biographical archive. K. G. Saur, 1997–2000. .

Malaysia 
New Malaysian who's who. Kasuya Publishing Sdn. Bhd., 1990–2005. .
People at the peak: the who's who of Malaysia. MI Pub. Sdn. Bhd, 2004-. ISSN 1823-3317.
Wispelwey, Berend. South-East Asian biographical archive. K. G. Saur, 1997–2000. .

Myanmar (Burma) 

Wispelwey, Berend. South-East Asian biographical archive. K. G. Saur, 1997–2000. .

Philippines 
Manuel, E. Arsenio, Magdalena Avenir Manuel. Dictionary of Philippine biography. Filipiniana Publications, 1955–1995.
Mediavilla, Victor Herrero, L. Rosa Aguayo Nayle. Archivo biográfico de España, Portugal e Iberoamérica. New York: K. G. Saur, 1990. .
Wispelwey, Berend. South-East Asian biographical archive. K. G. Saur, 1997–2000. .

Singapore 
Who's who in Singapore. City Who's Who, 1981–.
Wispelwey, Berend. South-East Asian biographical archive. K. G. Saur, 1997–2000. .

Thailand 
Wispelwey, Berend. South-East Asian biographical archive. K. G. Saur, 1997–2000. .

Vietnam 
Brébion, Antoine, Antoine Cabaton. Dictionnaire de bio-bibliographie générale, ancienne et moderne de l'Indochine française. Société d'Éditions Géographiques, Maritimes et Coloniales, 1935.
Who's who in Vietnam. Barons Who's Who, 1998/1999–.
Wispelwey, Berend. South-East Asian biographical archive. K. G. Saur, 1997–2000. .

Western Asia 
Bidwell, Robin. Arabian personalities of the early twentieth century. Oleander Press, 1986. .
Fischbach, Michael R. Biographical encyclopedia of the modern Middle East and North Africa. Gale Group, 2008. .
Kramme, U., Z. Urra Muena. Arab-Islamic biographical archive (AIBA). K. G. Saur, 1994–2002. .
Leick, Gwendolyn. Who's who in the Ancient Near East. Routledge, 1999. .
Salisbury, Joyce E., Mary Lefkowitz. Encyclopedia of women in the ancient world. ABC-CLIO, 2001. .
Shimoni, Yaacov. The Biographical dictionary of the Middle East. Facts on File, 1991. .
Who's who in the Arab world. Publitec Editions, 1966–. ISSN 0083-9752.

Armenia 
Geron, Leonard, Alex Pravda. Who's who in Russia and the new states. I. B. Tauris, 1993. .
Mouradian, George. Armenian infotext. Bookshelf Publishers, 1995. .

Azerbaijan 
Geron, Leonard, Alex Pravda. Who's who in Russia and the new states. I. B. Tauris, 1993. .

Bahrain 
Asia Pacific InfoServ Pty Ltd. Who's who in Bahrain. Asia Pacific Infoserv, 2006-.

Cyprus 
Günümüz Türkiyesinde kim kimdir (Who's who in Turkey.) Profesyonel, 1986–2002?.
Koudounarēs, Aristeidēs L. Viographikon lexikon Kypriōn, 1800–1920. [s.n.], Typogr. St. Leivadiōtē, 2010. ; .
Koukounas, Dēmosthenēs, Natasa Koukouna. Viographikē enkyklopaideia tou neōterou Hellēnismou, 1830–2010: archeia hellēnikēs viographias. Ekdoseis Metron, 2011. .

Egypt

Georgia 
Geron, Leonard, Alex Pravda. Who's who in Russia and the new states. I. B. Tauris, 1993. .

Iran 
Iran who's who. Echo of Iran, 1972–. ISSN 0301-0341.
Milani, Abbas. Eminent Persians: The men and women who made modern Iran, 1941–1979: In two volumes. Syracuse University Press; Persian World Press, 2008. .

Iraq

Israel 
Who's who in Israel and Jewish personalities from all over the world. Bronfman, 1945–2001.

Jordan

Kuwait

Lebanon 
Who's who in Lebanon. Les Editions Publitec, 1963–. ISSN 0083-9612.

Oman

Qatar

Saudi Arabia 
Who's who in the Saudi Arabia. Asia Pacific InfoServ, 2006–.

Syria 
Moubayed, Sami M. Steel and silk: Men and women who shaped Syria, 1900–2000. Cune, 2006. .

Turkey 
Bey, Mehmet Süreyya, Nuri Akbayar, Seyit Ali Kahraman. Sicill-i Osmanî. Kültür Bakanligi ile Türkiye Ekonomik ve Toplumsal Tarih Vakfi'nin ortak yayinidir, 1996–1998. .
Günümüz Türkiyesinde kim kimdir (Who's who in Turkey.) Profesyonel, 1986–2002?.
Mitler, Louis. Ottoman Turkish writers: A bibliographical dictionary of significant figures in pre-Republican Turkish literature. P. Lang, 1988. .
Nicol, Donald MacGillivray. A biographical dictionary of the Byzantine Empire. Seaby, 1991. .
Sauer, Jutta. Türkisches biographisches archiv (TBA) or Turkish biographical archive. K. G. Saur, 1999–2002. (Turkish, English, French, German, Italian, Latin). .

United Arab Emirates

Yemen

Europe 
Emmerson, Richard Kenneth, Sandra Clayton-Emmerson. Key figures in medieval Europe: An encyclopedia. Routledge, 2006. .
Gordon, Peter, Richard Aldrich. Biographical dictionary of North American and European educationists. Woburn Press, 1997. .
Kamen, Henry Arthur Francis. Who's who in Europe, 1450–1750. Routledge, 2000. .
Raineval, Melville Henry Massue Ruvigny de. The titled nobility of Europe: An international peerage, or "Who's Who," of the sovereigns, princes, and nobles of Europe. Burke's Peerage, 1980. .
Salisbury, Joyce E., Mary Lefkowitz. Encyclopedia of women in the ancient world. ABC-CLIO, 2001. .

Caucasus

Abkhazia

Armenia 
Mouradian, George. Armenian infotext. Bookshelf Publishers, 1995. .

Azerbaijan

Georgia

Nagorno-Karabakh

South Ossetia

Central Europe 
Köhler-Lutterbeck, Ursula, Monika Siedentopf. Lexikon der 1000 Frauen. Dietz, 2000. .
Röder, Werner, Herbert Arthur Strauss. Biographisches Handbuch der deutschsprachigen Emigration nach 1933. K. G. Saur, 1980–1983. .
Roszkowski, Wojciech, Jan Kofman. Biographical dictionary of central and eastern Europe in the twentieth century. M.E. Sharpe, 2008. .
Taylor, Stephen. Who's who in central and east-Europe. Central European Times, 1934–.

Austria 
Ackerl, Isabella, Friedrich Weissensteiner. Österreichisches personen lexikon. Ueberreuter, 1992. .
Austrian Academy of Sciences (2012): Österreichisches Biographisches Lexikon 1815–1950, Vienna, 12 volumes containing 120,000 biographies (A–Spa) now published.  (Vol 1). Subscription-based online access available. 
Bruckmüller, Ernst. Personenlexikon Österreich. Verlagsgemeinschaft Österreich-Lexikon, 2001. .
Killy, Walther, Rudolf Vierhaus, Dietrich von Engelhardt, Christiane Banerji. Dictionary of German biography. K. G. Saur, 2001–2006. .
Österreichische Akademie der Wissenschaften. Österreichisches biographisches lexikon und biographische dokumentation. Verlag der Österreichischen Akademie der Wissenschaften. Available online here.
Stock, Karl F., Rudolf Heilinger, Marylène Stock. Personalbibliographien österreichischer Persönlichkeiten. K. G. Saur, 1987–2010. .
Taylor, Stephen. Who's who in central and east-Europe. Central European Times, 1934–.

Croatia 
Bernath, Mathias, Felix von Schroeder. Biographisches Lexikon zur Geschichte Südosteuropas. Oldenbourg, 1970–1981.
Roszkowski, Wojciech, Jan Kofman. Biographical dictionary of central and eastern Europe in the twentieth century. M.E. Sharpe, 2008. .
Stroynowski, Juliusz. Who's who in the socialist countries of Europe: A biographical encyclopedia of more than 12,600 leading personalities in Albania, Bulgaria, Czechoslovakia, German Democratic Republic, Hungary, Poland, Romania, Yugoslavia. K. G. Saur, 1989. .
Taylor, Stephen. Who's who in central and east-Europe. Central European Times, 1934–.

Czech Republic 
Churaň, Milan. Kdo byl kdo v našich dějinách ve 20. století. Libri, 1994. Available online here.
Kramme, Ulrike, Želmíra Urra Muena. Český biografický archiv a slovenský biografický archív (CSBA): Tschechisches und slowakisches biographisches archiv: Eine kumulation aus 206 der wichtigsten biographischen nachschlagewerke für den tschechischen und slowakischen bereich bis zur gegenwart. K. G. Saur, 1993–1999. . (Czech, English, French, German, Hungarian, Latin, and Slovakian)
Mináč, Vladimír. Slovenský biografický slovník: Od roku 833 do roku 1990. Matica slovenská, 1986–1994. .
Roszkowski, Wojciech, Jan Kofman. Biographical dictionary of central and eastern Europe in the twentieth century. M.E. Sharpe, 2008. .
Stroynowski, Juliusz. Who's who in the socialist countries of Europe: A biographical encyclopedia of more than 12,600 leading personalities in Albania, Bulgaria, Czechoslovakia, German Democratic Republic, Hungary, Poland, Romania, Yugoslavia. K. G. Saur, 1989. .
Taylor, Stephen. Who's who in central and east-Europe. Central European Times, 1934–.
Tomeš, Josef. Český biografický slovník XX. století. Paseka, 1999. .
Trestik, Michael. Kdo je kdo: Osobnosti ceské soucasnosti: 5000 zivotopisu. Agentura Kdo je Kdo, 2005. .

Germany

Hungary 
Bernath, Mathias, Felix von Schroeder. Biographisches Lexikon zur Geschichte Südosteuropas. Oldenbourg, 1970–1981.
Biográf ki kicsoda. Enciklopédia Kiadó, 2002–. .

Kenyeres, Ágnes, Bortnyik Sándor. Magyar életrajzi lexikon: főszerkesztő Kenyeres Ágnes. Akadémiai Kiadó, 1967–1994. (Hungarian) . Also available online here.
Kramme, U., Ž. Urra Muena. Ungarisches biographisches archiv. K. G. Saur, 1993–1999. . (Hungarian, English, German, Latin).
Marako, Laszlo. Ki kicsoda a magyar történelemben. Helikon, 2005. ; .
Roszkowski, Wojciech, Jan Kofman. Biographical dictionary of central and eastern Europe in the twentieth century. M.E. Sharpe, 2008. .
Stroynowski, Juliusz. Who's who in the socialist countries of Europe: A biographical encyclopedia of more than 12,600 leading personalities in Albania, Bulgaria, Czechoslovakia, German Democratic Republic, Hungary, Poland, Romania, Yugoslavia. K. G. Saur, 1989. .

Taylor, Stephen. Who's who in central and east-Europe. Central European Times, 1934–.

Kosovo 
Stroynowski, Juliusz. Who's who in the socialist countries of Europe: A biographical encyclopedia of more than 12,600 leading personalities in Albania, Bulgaria, Czechoslovakia, German Democratic Republic, Hungary, Poland, Romania, Yugoslavia. K. G. Saur, 1989. .

Poland 
Cyniker, Beata. Kto jest kim w Polsce. PAI, 2001. .
Hebig, Dieter, Oswald Balzer. Polskie archiwum biograficzne = Polnisches biographisches archiv. K. G. Saur, 1992–1995. . (Polish, English, French, German, Latin, and Russian).

Majchrowski, Jacek, Grzegorz Mazur, Kamil Stepan. Kto był kim w Drugiej Rzeczypospolitej. Polska Oficyna Wydawnicza "BGW", 1994. .
Roszkowski, Wojciech, Jan Kofman. Biographical dictionary of central and eastern Europe in the twentieth century. M.E. Sharpe, 2008. .
Sokol, Stanley S., Sharon F. Mrotek Kissane, Alfred L. Abramowicz. The Polish biographical dictionary: Profiles of nearly 900 Poles who have made lasting contributions to world civilization. Bolchazy-Carducci, 1992. .
Stroynowski, Juliusz. Who's who in the socialist countries of Europe: A biographical encyclopedia of more than 12,600 leading personalities in Albania, Bulgaria, Czechoslovakia, German Democratic Republic, Hungary, Poland, Romania, Yugoslavia. K. G. Saur, 1989. .
Taylor, Stephen. Who's who in central and east-Europe. Central European Times, 1934–.

Romania 
Bernath, Mathias, Felix von Schroeder. Biographisches Lexikon zur Geschichte Südosteuropas. Oldenbourg, 1970–1981.
Roszkowski, Wojciech, Jan Kofman. Biographical dictionary of central and eastern Europe in the twentieth century. M.E. Sharpe, 2008. .
Stoica, Stan. Dicționar biografic de istorie a României. Editura Meronia, 2008.
Stroynowski, Juliusz. Who's who in the socialist countries of Europe: A biographical encyclopedia of more than 12,600 leading personalities in Albania, Bulgaria, Czechoslovakia, German Democratic Republic, Hungary, Poland, Romania, Yugoslavia. K. G. Saur, 1989. .
Taylor, Stephen. Who's who in central and east-Europe. Central European Times, 1934–.

Serbia 
Leskovac, Mladen, Aleksandar Forišković, Čedomir Popov. Srpski biografski rečnik. Budućnost, 2004–2007. . (Serbian).
Roszkowski, Wojciech, Jan Kofman. Biographical dictionary of central and eastern Europe in the twentieth century. M.E. Sharpe, 2008. .
Taylor, Stephen. Who's who in central and east-Europe. Central European Times, 1934–.

Slovakia 
Churaň, Milan. Kdo byl kdo v našich dějinách ve 20. století. Libri, 1994. Available online here.
Kramme, Ulrike, Želmíra Urra Muena. Český biografický archiv a slovenský biografický archív (CSBA): Tschechisches und slowakisches biographisches archiv: Eine kumulation aus 206 der wichtigsten biographischen nachschlagewerke für den tschechischen und slowakischen bereich bis zur gegenwart. K. G. Saur, 1993–1999. . (Czech, English, French, German, Hungarian, Latin, and Slovakian)
Mat'ovčík, Augustín, L'udmila Ďuranová, Anna Šourková. Lexikón slovenských žien. Slovenská národná knižnica, Národný biografický ústav, 2003. .
Mináč, Vladimír. Slovenský biografický slovník: Od roku 833 do roku 1990. Matica slovenská, 1986–1994. .
Parenicka, Pavol. Biografický lexikón Slovenska. Slovenská Národná Kniznica, Národný biografický ústav, 2002–. .
Roszkowski, Wojciech, Jan Kofman. Biographical dictionary of central and eastern Europe in the twentieth century. M.E. Sharpe, 2008. .
Stroynowski, Juliusz. Who's who in the socialist countries of Europe: A biographical encyclopedia of more than 12,600 leading personalities in Albania, Bulgaria, Czechoslovakia, German Democratic Republic, Hungary, Poland, Romania, Yugoslavia. K. G. Saur, 1989. .
Taylor, Stephen. Who's who in central and east-Europe. Central European Times, 1934–.

Slovenia 
Bajt, Drago. Slovenski kdo je kdo. Nova revija, 1999. .
Bernath, Mathias, Felix von Schroeder. Biographisches Lexikon zur Geschichte Südosteuropas. Oldenbourg, 1970–1981.
Roszkowski, Wojciech, Jan Kofman. Biographical dictionary of central and eastern Europe in the twentieth century. M.E. Sharpe, 2008. .
Stanonik, Tončka, Lan Brenk. Osebnosti: veliki slovenski biografski leksikon. Mladinska knjiga, 2008. .
Stroynowski, Juliusz. Who's who in the socialist countries of Europe: A biographical encyclopedia of more than 12,600 leading personalities in Albania, Bulgaria, Czechoslovakia, German Democratic Republic, Hungary, Poland, Romania, Yugoslavia. K. G. Saur, 1989. .
Taylor, Stephen. Who's who in central and east-Europe. Central European Times, 1934–.

Eastern Europe 
Roszkowski, Wojciech, Jan Kofman. Biographical dictionary of central and eastern Europe in the twentieth century. M.E. Sharpe, 2008. .
Taylor, Stephen. Who's who in central and east-Europe. Central European Times, 1934–.

Albania 
Bernath, Mathias, Felix von Schroeder. Biographisches Lexikon zur Geschichte Südosteuropas. Oldenbourg, 1970–1981.
Elsie, Robert. A biographical dictionary of Albanian history. I.B. Tauris in association with The Centre for Albanian Studies, 2013. ; .
Roszkowski, Wojciech, Jan Kofman. Biographical dictionary of central and eastern Europe in the twentieth century. M.E. Sharpe, 2008. .
Stroynowski, Juliusz. Who's who in the socialist countries of Europe: A biographical encyclopedia of more than 12,600 leading personalities in Albania, Bulgaria, Czechoslovakia, German Democratic Republic, Hungary, Poland, Romania, Yugoslavia. K. G. Saur, 1989. .
Taylor, Stephen. Who's who in central and east-Europe. Central European Times, 1934–.

Armenia

Belarus 
Geron, Leonard, Alex Pravda. Who's who in Russia and the new states. I. B. Tauris, 1993. .
Roszkowski, Wojciech, Jan Kofman. Biographical dictionary of central and eastern Europe in the twentieth century. M.E. Sharpe, 2008. .

Bosnia and Herzegovina 
Bernath, Mathias, Felix von Schroeder. Biographisches Lexikon zur Geschichte Südosteuropas. Oldenbourg, 1970–1981.
Roszkowski, Wojciech, Jan Kofman. Biographical dictionary of central and eastern Europe in the twentieth century. M.E. Sharpe, 2008. .
Stroynowski, Juliusz. Who's who in the socialist countries of Europe: A biographical encyclopedia of more than 12,600 leading personalities in Albania, Bulgaria, Czechoslovakia, German Democratic Republic, Hungary, Poland, Romania, Yugoslavia. K. G. Saur, 1989. .
Taylor, Stephen. Who's who in central and east-Europe. Central European Times, 1934–.

Bulgaria 
Bernath, Mathias, Felix von Schroeder. Biographisches Lexikon zur Geschichte Südosteuropas. Oldenbourg, 1970–1981.
Cholpanov, Boris, Vasil Giu͡zelev, Simeon Mitev. Belezhiti bŭlgari. Dŭrzh voenno izd-vo, 1968–1984.
Kitsevski, Nikola, Raicho Radulov. Koi koi e v Bulgariia. Trud, 1998–.
Stroynowski, Juliusz. Who's who in the socialist countries of Europe: A biographical encyclopedia of more than 12,600 leading personalities in Albania, Bulgaria, Czechoslovakia, German Democratic Republic, Hungary, Poland, Romania, Yugoslavia. K. G. Saur, 1989. .
Taylor, Stephen. Who's who in central and east-Europe. Central European Times, 1934–.

Estonia

Georgia

Latvia

Lithuania

Macedonia 
Stroynowski, Juliusz. Who's who in the socialist countries of Europe: A biographical encyclopedia of more than 12,600 leading personalities in Albania, Bulgaria, Czechoslovakia, German Democratic Republic, Hungary, Poland, Romania, Yugoslavia. K. G. Saur, 1989. .

Moldova 
Geron, Leonard, Alex Pravda. Who's who in Russia and the new states. I. B. Tauris, 1993. .
Roszkowski, Wojciech, Jan Kofman. Biographical dictionary of central and eastern Europe in the twentieth century. M.E. Sharpe, 2008. .

Montenegro 
Stroynowski, Juliusz. Who's who in the socialist countries of Europe: A biographical encyclopedia of more than 12,600 leading personalities in Albania, Bulgaria, Czechoslovakia, German Democratic Republic, Hungary, Poland, Romania, Yugoslavia. K. G. Saur, 1989. .

Poland

Romania

Russia

Serbia 
Stroynowski, Juliusz. Who's who in the socialist countries of Europe: A biographical encyclopedia of more than 12,600 leading personalities in Albania, Bulgaria, Czechoslovakia, German Democratic Republic, Hungary, Poland, Romania, Yugoslavia. K. G. Saur, 1989. .

Slovakia

Slovenia

Ukraine 
Geron, Leonard, Alex Pravda. Who's who in Russia and the new states. I. B. Tauris, 1993. .
Roszkowski, Wojciech, Jan Kofman. Biographical dictionary of central and eastern Europe in the twentieth century. M.E. Sharpe, 2008. .

Northern Europe 

 Kay, Ernest, Editorial Director,  Dictionary of Scandinavian Biography,  International Biographic Centre,  Cambridge, England   1976

Denmark 
Engelstoft, Povl; Dahl, Svend, ed. (1979–84): Dansk biografisk leksikon (Danish Biographical Dictionary), 3rd edition in 16 volumes, Copenhagen, Gyldendal, . Free searchable online access to the current updated version, is available from Gyldendal's Den Store Danske website. 
Erichsen, Balder Vermund Aage, Alfred Krarup. Dansk historisk bibliografi: Systematisk fortegnelse over bidrag til Danmarks historie til udgangen af 1912, i tilslutning til Bibliotheca Danica. I kommission hos G. E. C. Gad, 1929.
Ilsøe, Harald. 555 danske selvbiografier og erindringer: En kronologisk fører med referater til trykte selvbiografier forfattet af personer født før 1790. Danske sprog- og litteraturselskab: C. A. Reitzel, 1987. .
 Larsen, Jytte (ed) (2001), Dansk kvindebiografisk leksikon (Biographical Encyclopedia of Danish Women), Volumes 1-3, Copenhagen, Rosinante. . The searchable online edition contains over 1,900 biographies from the Middle Ages to the present. 
Kraks Blå Bog (Who's Who in Denmark) online edition, 8219 biographies -3, 
Metherell, David, Paul Guthrie. Scandinavian biographical archive. K. G. Saur, 1989–1991. .

Faroe Islands

Estonia 
Alakula, Allan. Kes on kes? Ekspresskataloogide AS, 2000. .
Bayerische Staatsbibliothek, Universitätsbibliothek Tartu. Baltische biographische lexika. Münchener Digitalisierungszentrum, Available online here.
Geron, Leonard, Alex Pravda. Who's who in Russia and the new states. I. B. Tauris, 1993. .
Korobov, Igorʹ, Li͡udmila Raudtits. Ėstonskiĭ biograficheskiĭ slovarʹ. KRK, 2002. .
Nirk, Endel, Arthur Robert Hone, Oleg Mutt. Estonian literature: Historical survey with biobibliographical appendix. Perioodika, 1987.
Roszkowski, Wojciech, Jan Kofman. Biographical dictionary of central and eastern Europe in the twentieth century. M.E. Sharpe, 2008. .
Taylor, Stephen. Who's who in central and east-Europe. Central European Times, 1934–.
Welding, Olaf, Wilhelm Lenz. Deutschbaltisches biographisches Lexikon 1710–1960. Böhlau Verlag, 1970. ; . Available free online here.

Finland 

Klinge, Matti. Suomen kansallisbiografia. Suomalaisen Kirjallisuuden Seura, 2003–. .
Kuka kukin on. Kustannusosakeyhtiö Otava, [etc.], 1920–. (Finnish).
Metherell, David, Paul Guthrie. Scandinavian biographical archive. K. G. Saur, 1989–1991. .
Taylor, Stephen. Who's who in central and east-Europe. Central European Times, 1934–.
Vem och vad: Biografisk handbok. Schildt, 1920–. ISSN 0789-3272.

Aland Islands

Iceland 
Guðnason, Jón, Pétur Haraldsson. Íslenzkir samtíðarmenn. Bókaútgáfan samtíðarmenn, 1965–.
Metherell, David, Paul Guthrie. Scandinavian biographical archive. K. G. Saur, 1989–1991. .

Ireland 
Jacobs, Phyllis M. Registers of the universities, colleges, and schools of Great Britain and Ireland. Athlone Press, 1964.
Jones, David Lewis. British and Irish biographies, 1840–1940. Chadwick-Healey, 1984–.
McGuire, J. I., James Quinn. Dictionary of Irish biography. Cambridge University Press, 2009. Available here.
O'Donoughue, D. J. The poets of Ireland: A biographical and bibliographical dictionary of Irish writers of English verse. Hodges, Figgis and Company, 1912.
Phelan, Angela. Who's who in Ireland: The influential Irish. Madison Publications, 2006. .

Latvia 
Apinis, Peteris. A hundred great Latvians. Lauku Avize, 2006. .
Bayerische Staatsbibliothek, Universitätsbibliothek Tartu. Baltische biographische lexika. Münchener Digitalisierungszentrum, Available online here.
Geron, Leonard, Alex Pravda. Who's who in Russia and the new states. I. B. Tauris, 1993. .
Roszkowski, Wojciech, Jan Kofman. Biographical dictionary of central and eastern Europe in the twentieth century. M.E. Sharpe, 2008. .
Taylor, Stephen. Who's who in central and east-Europe. Central European Times, 1934–.
Welding, Olaf, Wilhelm Lenz. Deutschbaltisches biographisches Lexikon 1710–1960. Böhlau Verlag, 1970. ; . Available free online here.

Lithuania 
Bayerische Staatsbibliothek, Universitätsbibliothek Tartu. Baltische biographische lexika. Münchener Digitalisierungszentrum, Available online here.
Biržiška, Vaclovas. Aleksandrynas; senųjų lietuvių rašytojų, rašiusių prieš 1865 m., biografijos, bibliografijos ir biobibliografijos (Aleksandrynas; biographies, bibliographies, and bio-bibliographies of old Lithuanian authors to 1865.) Išleido JAV LB Kultūros fondas, 1960–1965.
Geron, Leonard, Alex Pravda. Who's who in Russia and the new states. I. B. Tauris, 1993. .
Roszkowski, Wojciech, Jan Kofman. Biographical dictionary of central and eastern Europe in the twentieth century. M.E. Sharpe, 2008. .
Taylor, Stephen. Who's who in central and east-Europe. Central European Times, 1934–.
Welding, Olaf, Wilhelm Lenz. Deutschbaltisches biographisches Lexikon 1710–1960. Böhlau Verlag, 1970. ; . Available free online here.

Norway 
Andersen, Alf G., Hans-Erik Hensen. 500 som preget Norge: Norske kvinner og menn i det 20. århundre. Millennium, 1999. . 
Arntzen, Jon Gunnar, ed. (2009). Norsk biografisk leksikon (Norwegian Biographical Dictionary). Oslo: Kunnskapsforlaget. The print edition (1985) in 19 volumes contains 5,100 articles. . The searchable online edition is a component of the Store norske leksikon. 

Metherell, David, Paul Guthrie. Scandinavian biographical archive. K. G. Saur, 1989–1991. .

Svalbard

Sweden 
 Freely accessible facsimile at the Project Runeberg website.
 The Dictionary of Swedish National Biography, first published in 1917 (volume 1). Today there are 33 volumes containing some 14,000 articles. Free searchable online access is available from Riksarkivet.
Metherell, David, Paul Guthrie. Scandinavian biographical archive. K. G. Saur, 1989–1991. .
Personhnistoriska samfundet. Personhistorisk tidskrift. Personhistoriska samfundet, 1898/99–. ISSN 0031-5699.
Thyselius, Erik, Göran Lindblad. Vem är det? Norstedt, 1912–. (Swedish)

United Kingdom 
Alexander, Marc. A companion to the royal heritage of Britain. Sutton, 2005. ; .
Baile, Laureen, Paul Sieveking. British biographical archive: A one-alphabet cumulation of 324 of the most important English-language biographical reference works originally published between 1601 and 1929. K. G. Saur, 1984–1989. .
Banks, Olive. The biographical dictionary of British feminists. New York University Press, 1985–1990. .
Black, A and C. Who's who and who was who. Oxford University Press, 2007. Available online here.
Cannon, John, Frank Robinson. Biography database: 1680–1830. Romulus Press, 1995–2000.
Contemporary theatre, film, and television. Gale Research, 1984–. ISSN 0749-064X.

Herbert, Stephen, Luke McKernan, British Film Institute. Who's who of Victorian cinema. British Film Institute, 1996. Available online here.

Jacobs, Phyllis M. Registers of the universities, colleges, and schools of Great Britain and Ireland. Athlone Press, 1964.
Jenkins, Ellen J. Eighteenth-Century British Historians. Thomson Gale, 2007. .
Jones, David Lewis. British and Irish biographies, 1840–1940. Chadwick-Healey, 1984–.

Mander, W. J., Alan P. F. Sell. The dictionary of nineteenth-century British philosophers. Thoemmes, 2002. .
Matthews, William. British autobiographies: An annotated bibliography of British autobiographies published or written before 1951. University of California Press, 1955.
Methodist who's who. Culley, 1910.
Munk, William, G. H. Brown, Richard Robertson Trail. The roll of the Royal College of Physicians of London: Comprising biographical sketches of all the eminent physicians whose names are recorded in the Annals... Royal College of Physicians of London, 1878–.
Peel, Albert. The Congregational two hundred, 1530–1948. Independent Press, [1948].
Royal Society (Great Britain). Biographical memoirs of fellows of the royal society. Royal Society, 1955–. ISSN 0080-4606.

 (All 63 volumes available (1885–1900) in Wikisource, with some of the supplement volumes)
Oxford Dictionary of National Biography (online) (subscription required)
Stewart, William. British and Irish poets: a biographical dictionary, 449-2006. McFarland, 2007. .

Todd, Janet M. A dictionary of British and American women writers, 1660–1800. Rowman and Allanheld, 1985. .
Treasure, Geoffrey, Ian Dawson. Who's who in British history: Beginnings to 1901. Fitzroy Dearborn, 1998. .
Valentine, Alan Chester. The British establishment, 1760–1784: An eighteenth-century biographical dictionary. University of Oklahoma Press, [1970]. .

England 

Oldfield, Sybil. Collective biography of women in England, 1550–1900: A select annotated bibliography. Mansell, 1999. .
Robin, Diana Maury, Anne R. Larsen, Carole Levin. Encyclopedia of women in the Renaissance: Italy, France, and England. ABC-CLIO, 2007. .
Talbot, C. H., Eugene Ashby Hammond. The medical practitioners in medieval England: A biographical register. Wellcome Historical Medical Library, 1965.

Guernsey

Isle of Man

Jersey

Northern Ireland 
Newmann, Kate. Dictionary of Ulster biography. Ulster History Circle, 2007-. Available online here.
Who's who in Northern Ireland. Inglewood Books, 1998–. .

Scotland 

Ewan, Elizabeth, Sue Innes, Siân Reynolds, Rose Pipes. The biographical dictionary of Scottish women: from the earliest times to 2004. Edinburgh University Press, 2006. .
Goring, Rosemary. Chambers Scottish biographical dictionary. Chambers, 1992. .
Dictionary of Scottish Architects (online)
National Library of Scotland. Scottish book trade index. National Library of Scotland. Available online here.

Who's who in Scotland. Carrick Media, 1986–. .

Wales 
National Library of Wales. Welsh biography online. National Library of Wales, 2004.

Southern Europe 
Kramme, U., Ž. Urra Muena. Südosteuropäisches biographisches archiv (SOBA). K. G. Saur, 1998–2004. .

Albania 
Kramme, U., Ž. Urra Muena. Südosteuropäisches biographisches archiv (SOBA). K. G. Saur, 1998–2004. .

Andorra

Bosnia and Herzegovina 
Kramme, U., Ž. Urra Muena. Südosteuropäisches biographisches archiv (SOBA). K. G. Saur, 1998–2004. .

Bulgaria 
Kramme, U., Ž. Urra Muena. Südosteuropäisches biographisches archiv (SOBA). K. G. Saur, 1998–2004. .

Croatia 
Kramme, U., Ž. Urra Muena. Südosteuropäisches biographisches archiv (SOBA). K. G. Saur, 1998–2004. .

Cyprus 
Koudounarēs, Aristeidēs L. Viographikon lexikon Kypriōn, 1800–1920. [s.n.], Typogr. St. Leivadiōtē, 2010. ; .

Gibraltar

Greece 
Bernath, Mathias, Felix von Schroeder. Biographisches Lexikon zur Geschichte Südosteuropas. Oldenbourg, 1970–1981.
Koukounas, Dēmosthenēs, Natasa Koukouna. Viographikē enkyklopaideia tou neōterou Hellēnismou, 1830–2010: archeia hellēnikēs viographias. Ekdoseis Metron, 2011. .
Schmuck, Hilmar. Griechisches biographisches archiv (GBA) or Greek biographical archive. K. G. Saur, 1998–2001. .
Taylor, Stephen. Who's who in central and east-Europe. Central European Times, 1934–.
Who's who in Greece. Metron, 1996/97–. ISSN 1108-4294.

Italy 
Ascarelli, Fernanda. La tipografia cinquecentina italiana. Sansoni antiquariato, 1953. (Italian)
Cosenza, Mario Emilio. Biographical and bibliographical dictionary of the Italian humanists and of the world of classical scholarship in Italy, 1300–1800. G. K. Hall, [1962]–1967.
Dell'Arti, Giorgio, Massimo Perrini. Catalogo dei viventi 2009: 7247 italiani notevoli. Marsilio, 2008. .
Ghisalberti, Alberto M.; Romanelli, Raffaele, ed. (1960), Dizionario Biografico degli Italiani (Biographical Dictionary of Italians), Rome, Istituto dell'Enciclopedia italiana, 76 volumes covering A-Mor. Free searchable online access is available from Treccani.it. 
Hazel, John. Who's who in the Roman world. Routledge. .
Mafai, Miriam, Natalia Aspesi. Le Donne italiane: Il chi e del '900. Rizzoli, 1993. . (Italian)
Manzoni, Cesare. Biografia italica: Saggio bibliografico di opere italiane a stampa per servire alla biografia degli Italiani. Biblio Verlag, 1981. .

Nappo, Tommaso, Silvio Furlani. Archivio biografico italiano: Cumulativo di 321 repertori biografici fra i più importanti a partire dal sec. XVII sino all'inizio del sec. XX. Saur, 1987–1990. .
Robin, Diana Maury, Anne R. Larsen, Carole Levin. Encyclopedia of women in the Renaissance: Italy, France, and England. ABC-CLIO, 2007. .
Roccella, Eugenia, Lucetta Scaraffia. Italiane. Dipartimento per l'informazione e l'editoria, [2004]. (Italian)
Spreti, Vittorio. Enciclopedia storico-nobiliare italiana. Ed. Enciclopedia storico-nobiliare italiana, 1928–1936.
Who's who in Italy. Who's Who in Italy S. r. l. Available online here.

Macedonia 
Bernath, Mathias, Felix von Schroeder. Biographisches Lexikon zur Geschichte Südosteuropas. Oldenbourg, 1970–1981.
Kramme, U., Ž. Urra Muena. Südosteuropäisches biographisches archiv (SOBA). K. G. Saur, 1998–2004. .
Roszkowski, Wojciech, Jan Kofman. Biographical dictionary of central and eastern Europe in the twentieth century. M.E. Sharpe, 2008. .
Taylor, Stephen. Who's who in central and east-Europe. Central European Times, 1934–.

Malta 
Schiavone, Michael J. Dictionary of Maltese biographies. Pubblikazzjonijiet Indipendenza, 2009. .

Montenegro 
Bernath, Mathias, Felix von Schroeder. Biographisches Lexikon zur Geschichte Südosteuropas. Oldenbourg, 1970–1981.
Kramme, U., Ž. Urra Muena. Südosteuropäisches biographisches archiv (SOBA). K. G. Saur, 1998–2004. .
Roszkowski, Wojciech, Jan Kofman. Biographical dictionary of central and eastern Europe in the twentieth century. M.E. Sharpe, 2008. .
Taylor, Stephen. Who's who in central and east-Europe. Central European Times, 1934–.

Portugal 
Mediavilla, Victor Herrero, L. Rosa Aguayo Nayle. Archivo biográfico de España, Portugal e Iberoamérica. New York: K. G. Saur, 1990. .
Rector, Monica, Fred M. Clark. Portuguese writers. Gale Group, 2004. .

Romania 
Kramme, U., Ž. Urra Muena. Südosteuropäisches biographisches archiv (SOBA). K. G. Saur, 1998–2004. .

San Marino

Serbia 
Bernath, Mathias, Felix von Schroeder. Biographisches Lexikon zur Geschichte Südosteuropas. Oldenbourg, 1970–1981.
Kramme, U., Ž. Urra Muena. Südosteuropäisches biographisches archiv (SOBA). K. G. Saur, 1998–2004. .

Slovenia 
Kramme, U., Ž. Urra Muena. Südosteuropäisches biographisches archiv (SOBA). K. G. Saur, 1998–2004. .

Spain 
Casado, Juan Delgado. Diccionario de impresores españoles, siglos XV-XVII. Arco-Libros, 1996. .
Contemporary Hispanic biography: profiles from the international Hispanic community. Gale, 2002–. ISSN 1541-1524.
Mediavilla, Victor Herrero, L. Rosa Aguayo Nayle. Archivo biográfico de España, Portugal e Iberoamérica. New York: K. G. Saur, 1990. .
Quién es quién en España. Editorial Campillo, 1981–.
Real Academía de la Historia (2011), Diccionario Biográfico Español (Spanish Biographical Dictionary).  (set of 20 volumes). 
Who's who in Spain. Who's Who in Italy, 1987–. Available online here.

Catalonia 
Diccionari biogràfic. Alberti, [1966–1970].

Turkey 
Bernath, Mathias, Felix von Schroeder. Biographisches Lexikon zur Geschichte Südosteuropas. Oldenbourg, 1970–1981.
Taylor, Stephen. Who's who in central and east-Europe. Central European Times, 1934–.
Turkish Cultural Foundation. Who's who in Turkish culture and art. Turkish Cultural Foundation. Available online here.

Vatican City

Western Europe

Andorra

Austria

Belgium 
 The Biographie Nationale, Brussels, 1986, consists of 44 volumes and the Nouvelle Biographie Nationale (2012) of nine volumes. Online access is available. The biography includes famous Belgians and foreigners who played an important role while living in Belgium. Only those who had died before the date of publication are included. Biographie Nationale et Nouvelle Biographie Nationale numérisées. The Biographie Nationale

Académie royale des sciences, des lettres et des beaux-arts de Belgique. Nouvelle biographie nationale. Académie royale des sciences, des lettres et des beaux-arts de Belgique: Diffusion, P. Mardaga, 1988–2005.
Delzenne, Yves-William, Jean Houyoux. Le nouveau dictionnaire des Belges. Le Cri éditions: La Libre Belgique, [1998]. .
Duverger, Jozef. Nationaal biografisch woordenboek. Paleis der Academiën, 1964–.
Gorzny, Willi, Willemina van der Meer. Biografisch archief van de Benelux: Archives biographiques des pays du Benelux = Biographical archive of the Benelux countries = Biographisches archiv der Benelux-Länder (BAB). Saur, 1992–1994. (Dutch, French, and German). .
Makrotest, Cegos. Wie is wie in Vlaanderen. Cegos Makrotest, 1980–.
Rouzet, Anne, Micheline Colin-Boon. Dictionnaire des imprimeurs, libraires et éditeurs des XVe et XVIe siècles dans les limites géographiques de la Belgique actuelle. B. de Graaf, 1975. .

Denmark

Estonian 
 Eesti Spordi Biograafiline Leksikon  (online)

Finland

France 
Balteau, J., Michel Prévost, Roman d'Amat, M. Barroux. Dictionnaire de biographie française. Letouzey et Ané, 1933–[2012].
Caratini, Roger. Dictionnaire des personnages de la Révolution. Le Pré aux Clercs, 1988. .
Cornevin, Robert, Jacques Serre, Académie des sciences d'outre-mer. Hommes et destins: Dictionnaire biographique d'outre-mer. Académie des sciences d'outre-mer, 1975–2011. .
Dittmar, Gérald. Dictionnaire biographique illustré de la Commune de Paris de 1871. Dittmar, 2004. .

Julliard, Jacques, Michel Winock, Pascal Balmand. Dictionnaire des intellectuels francais: Les personnes, les lieux, les moments. Seuil, 2002. . (French)

Lafitte, J. Who's who in France. J. Lafitte, 1953–. ISSN 0083-9531.
Maitron, Jean, Claude Pennetier. Dictionnaire biographique du mouvement ouvrier français. Editions Ouvrières, [1964]–1997. . (French).
Qui était qui, XXe siècle: Dictionnaire biographique des français disparus ayant marqué le XXe siècle. Éditions Jacques Lafitte, 2005. .
Renouard, Philippe. Imprimeurs and librairies parisiens du XVIe siècle: Ouvrage publié d'après les manuscrits de Philippe Renouard par le Service des travaux historiques de la ville de Paris avec la concours de Bibliotheque nationale. [Bibliothèque Nationale], 1964–1991.
Renouard, Philippe, Henri-Jean Martin, Dominique Renouard. Répertoire des imprimeurs parisiens: Libraires et fondeurs de caractères en exercice à Paris au XVIIe siècle. Libr. des arts et métiers-éditions, 1995. .

Robin, Diana Maury, Anne R. Larsen, Carole Levin. Encyclopedia of women in the Renaissance: Italy, France, and England. ABC-CLIO, 2007. .
Société Internationale pour l'Étude des Femmes de l'Ancien Régime. Dictionnaire des femmes de l'ancienne France. Société Internationale pour l'Étude des Femmes de l'Ancien Régime. Available online here.

Germany 

Gorzny, Willi. Deutsches biographisches archiv: Eine kumulation aus 284 der wichtigsten biographischen nachschlagewerke für den deutschsprachigen bereich. K. G. Saur, 1982–1985. .
Hockerts, Hans Günter; Brantl, Markus; Ebneth, Bernhard; Jordan, Stefan: Deutsche Biographie, providing online access to over 21,000 articles from Neue Deutsche Biographie (Hockertsand, Hans Günter, ed., Berlin, Duncker & Humblor, 1953–2010, cf Vol 1), 26,000 articles from Allgemeine Deutsche Biographie (1912) as well as biographies from other sources. Internet access is coordinated by the Bavarian Academy of Sciences and Humanities and the Bavarian State Library. 
Keith-Smith, Brian. An encyclopedia of German women writers, 1900–1933: Biographies and bibliographies with exemplary readings. E. Mellen Press, c1997–c1998. .
Killy, Walther, Rudolf Vierhaus, Dietrich von Engelhardt, Christiane Banerji. Dictionary of German biography. K. G. Saur, 2001–2006. .
Biographisch-Bibliographisches Kirchenlexikon  online 
Klee, Ernst. Das Personenlexikon zum Dritten Reich: Wer war was vor und nach 1945? S. Fischer, 2003. .
NDB ADB deutsche Biographie. Bayerische Staatsbibliothek; Deutsche Nationalbibliothek; Bayerische Akademie der Wissenschaften; Historische Kommission; Duncker & Humblot, 2003. Available online here.
Stroynowski, Juliusz. Who's who in the socialist countries of Europe: A biographical encyclopedia of more than 12,600 leading personalities in Albania, Bulgaria, Czechoslovakia, German Democratic Republic, Hungary, Poland, Romania, Yugoslavia. K. G. Saur, 1989. .
Weber, Hermann, Andreas Herbst. Deutsche Kommunisten: biographisches Handbuch 1918 bis 1945. Dietz, 2008. . (German) Freely available here.
Wedel, Gudrun. Autobiographien von Frauen: ein Lexikon. Böhlau, 2010. ; .
Weidmann, Conrad. Deutsche männer in Afrika: Lexicon der hervorragensten deutschen Afrika-forscher, missionare, etc. B. Nöhring, 1894.

Greece

Iceland

Ireland

Italy

Kosovo 
Bernath, Mathias, Felix von Schroeder. Biographisches Lexikon zur Geschichte Südosteuropas. Oldenbourg, 1970–1981.
Roszkowski, Wojciech, Jan Kofman. Biographical dictionary of central and eastern Europe in the twentieth century. M.E. Sharpe, 2008. .
Taylor, Stephen. Who's who in central and east-Europe. Central European Times, 1934–.

Liechtenstein 
Central European Times. Who's who in Switzerland including the principality of Liechtenstein. Central European Times, 1952–1999. ISSN 0083-9736.
Löschnigg, Hans. Wer ist wer? Wer tut was?: Handbuch für das Fürstentum Liechtenstein. F.P. van Eck, 1995. .

Luxembourg 
Gorzny, Willi, Willemina van der Meer. Biografisch archief van de Benelux: Archives biographiques des pays du Benelux = Biographical archive of the Benelux countries = Biographisches archiv der Benelux-Länder (BAB). Saur, 1992–1994. (Dutch, French, and German). .
Hausemer, Georges. Luxemburger Lexikon: Das Grossherzogtum Von A-Z. Editions G. Binsfeld, 2006. . (German).

Malta

Monaco

Netherlands 
. Freely available online here.
Biography Portal of the Netherlands. Instituut voor Nederlandse Geschiedenis [u.a.] 2010-. available here.

Digitaal Vrouwenlexicon van Nederland: informatie over de opmerkelijkste vrouwen uit de geschiedenis van Nederland en zijn overzeese gebiedsdelen van de vroegste tijden tot circa 1850 (Online Dictionary of Dutch Women.). Instituut voor Nederlandse Geschiedenis. [u. a., 2008-. Available online here.
Gorzny, Willi, Willemina van der Meer. Biografisch archief van de Benelux: Archives biographiques des pays du Benelux = Biographical archive of the Benelux countries = Biographisches archiv der Benelux-Länder (BAB). Saur, 1992–1994. (Dutch, French, and German). .

Wie is wie in Nederland. Pragma Nederland, [1984/1988–1994/1996]. ISSN 0920-539X.

Norway

Portugal 
de Oliveira, Leonel, Manuel Alves de Oliveira. Quem é quem: Portugueses célebres. Temas & Debates, 2009. .

San Marino

Spain

Sweden

Switzerland 
Central European Times. Who's who in Switzerland including the principality of Liechtenstein. Central European Times, 1952–1999. ISSN 0083-9736.

Killy, Walther, Rudolf Vierhaus, Dietrich von Engelhardt, Christiane Banerji. Dictionary of German biography. K. G. Saur, 2001–2006. .
Taylor, Stephen. Who's who in central and east-Europe. Central European Times, 1934–.

United Kingdom

Oceania 
Craig, Robert D., Russell T. Clement. Who's who in Oceania, 1980–1981. Institute for Polynesian Studies, Brigham Young University—Hawaii Campus, 1980.

Australasia

Australia 
Arnold, John, Deirdre Morris. Monash biographical dictionary of 20th century Australia. Reed Reference, 1994. .
Australian dictionary of biography. Australian National University, 2006-. Available online here .
Australian women's register. Available online here.
Gillen, Mollie, Yvonne Browning, Michael Flynn. The founders of Australia: A biographical dictionary of the first fleet. Library of Australian History, 1989. .
Gunew, Sneja Marina. A Bibliography of Australian multicultural writers. Centre for Studies in Literary Education, Humanities, Deakin University, 1992.
Ritchie, J; Kent, H (1991): Australian Dictionary of Biography. Index Vol 1-12 1788–1939, Melbourne University Publishing, 342 pages. . Online access to all volumes is available free of charge.
Spurway, John T., Allison Allen. Australian Biographical and Genealogical Record. Society of Australian Genealogists, 1992.
Walsh, Kay, Joy W. Hooton. Australian autobiographical narratives: An annotated bibliography. Australian Scholarly Editions Centre, University College, ADFA: National Library of Australia, 1993, 1998. .

New Guinea

New Zealand 
Macdonald, Charlotte, Merimeri Penfold, B. R. Williams. The book of New Zealand women (Ko kui ma te kaupapa.). B. Williams Books, 1991. .
Orange, Claudia, ed., (2003) Dictionary of New Zealand Biography, Auckland University Press, 5 volumes, over 3,000 biographies.  (Vol 1). Free searchable online access is available.

Melanesia

Fiji 
Berwick, Sam. Who's who in Fiji; who was who in Fiji: Fiji's golden book of record. Berwicks, 1990.

New Caledonia

Papua New Guinea

Solomon Islands

Vanuatu

Micronesia

Federated States of Micronesia

Guam

Kiribati

Marshall Islands

Nauru

Northern Mariana Islands

Palau

Polynesia

American Samoa

Cook Islands

Easter Island

French Polynesia

Tahiti 
O'Reilly, Patrick, Raoul Teissier, J. Boullaire. Tahitiens: Répertoire biographique de la Polynésie française. Musée de l'homme, 1975. (French)

Hawaii

New Zealand 
Macdonald, Charlotte, Merimeri Penfold, B. R. Williams. The book of New Zealand women (Ko kui ma te kaupapa.). B. Williams Books, 1991. .

Niue

Norfolk Island

Pitcairn Islands

Samoa

Tokelau

Tonga

Tuvalu

Wallis and Futuna

Women 

Adamson, Lynda G. Notable women in American history: A guide to recommended biographies and autobiographies. Greenwood Press, 1999. .
Adamson, Lynda G. Notable women in world history: A guide to recommended biographies and autobiographies. Greenwood Press, 1998. .
Australian women's register. Available online here.
Ba, Adam Konaré. Dictionnaire des femmes célèbres du Mali: Des temps mythico-légendaires au 26 mars 1991. Editions Jamana, 1993.
Babcock, Barbara A., Nancy J. Parezo. Daughters of the desert: Women anthropologists and the native American southwest, 1880–1980: An illustrated catalogue. University of New Mexico Press, 1988. .
Bailey, Martha J. American women in science: a biographical dictionary. ABC-CLIO, 1994. .
Bailey, Martha J. American women in science: 1950 to the present: a biographical dictionary. ABC-CLIO, 1998. .
Banks, Olive. The biographical dictionary of British feminists. New York University Press, 1985–1990. .
Bewley, Aisha Abdurrahman. Muslim women: A biographical dictionary. Ta-Ha, 2004. .
Booth, Alison. Collective biographies of women: an annotated bibliography. University of Virginia Libraries, 2004-. Available online here.
Boynton, Victoria, Jo Malin, Emmanuel S. Nelson. Encyclopedia of women's autobiography. Greenwood Press, 2005. .
Brinker-Gabler, Gisela, Karola Ludwig, Angela Woffen. Lexikon deutschsprachiger Schriftstellerinnen, 1800–1945. Deutscher Taschenbuch Verlag, 1986. . (German).
Christensen, Karen, Allen Guttmann, Gertrud Pfister. International encyclopedia of women and sports. Macmillan Reference USA, 2001. .
Cicarelli, James, Julianne Cicarelli. Distinguished women economists. Greenwood Press, 2003. .
Claghorn, Charles Eugene. Women composers and hymnists: A concise biographical dictionary. Scarecrow Press, 1984. .
Claghorn, Charles Eugene. Women composers and songwriters: A concise biographical dictionary. Scarecrow Press, 1996. .
Clinton, Catherine, Christine A. Lunardini. The Columbia guide to American women in the nineteenth century. Columbia University Press, 2000. .
Commire, Anne, Deborah Klezmer. Dictionary of women worldwide: 25,000 women through the ages. Thomson Gale, 2007. .
Commire, Anne, Deborah Klezmer. Women in world history: A biographical encyclopedia. Yorkin / Gale, 1999–2002. .
Cortina, Lynn Ellen Rice. Spanish-American women writers: A bibliographical research checklist. Garland, 1983. .
de Haan, Francisca, Krasimira Daskalova, Anna Loutfi. Biographical dictionary of women's movements and feminisms in Central, Eastern, and South Eastern Europe: 19th and 20th centuries. CEU Press/Central European University Press, 2006. .
Dimand, Robert W., Mary Ann Dimand, Evelyn L. Forget. A biographical dictionary of women economists. Edward Elgar, 2000. .
Dunford, Penny. A biographical dictionary of women artists in Europe and America since 1850. University of Pennsylvania Press, 1989. .
Ewan, Elizabeth, Sue Innes, Siân Reynolds, Rose Pipes. The biographical dictionary of Scottish women: from the earliest times to 2004. Edinburgh University Press, 2006. .
Fairbanks, Carol. Japanese women fiction writers: Their culture and society, 1890s to 1990s: English language sources. Scarecrow Press, 2002. .
Farris, Phoebe. Women artists of color: A bio-critical sourcebook to 20th century artists in the Americas. Greenwood Press, 1999. .
Foerstel, Karen. Biographical dictionary of congressional women. Greenwood Press, 1999. .
Fraire, Osvaldo A. Diccionario biográfico de la mujer en el Uruguay. s.l.: s.n., 1999.
Gacs, Ute. Women anthropologists: A biographical dictionary. Greenwood Press, 1988. .
Gaze, Delia, Maja Mihajlovic, Leanda Shrimpton. Dictionary of women artists. Fitzroy Dearborn, 1997. .
Golemba, Beverly E. Lesser-known women: A biographical dictionary. Lynne Rienner Publishers, 1992. .
Grattan, Virginia L. American women songwriters: A biographical dictionary. Greenwood Press, 1993. .
Grinstein, Louise S., Carol A. Biermann, Rose K. Rose. Women in the biological sciences: A biobibliographic sourcebook. Greenwood Press, 1997. .
Heller, Jules, Nancy Heller. North American women artists of the twentieth century: A biographical dictionary. Garland, 1995. .
Herman, Kali. Women in particular: An index to American women. Oryx Press, 1984. .
Hillstrom, Laurie Collier, Kevin Hillstrom, Lucy R. Lippard. Contemporary women artists. St. James Press, 1999. .
Hine, Darlene Clark. Black women in America. Oxford University Press, 2005. .
Hine, Darlene Clark, Kathleen Thompson, Facts on File, Inc. Facts on File encyclopedia of black women in America. Facts on File, Inc., 1997. .
Hyman, Paul, Deborah Dash Moore, Phyllis Holman Weisbard, American Jewish Historical SOciety. Jewish women in America: An historical encyclopedia. Routledge, 1997. .
The international who's who of women. Europa Publications Ltd., 1992–. ISSN 0965-3775.
Ireland, Norma Olin. Index to women of the world from ancient to modern times: Biographies and portraits. F. W. Faxon, 1970. .
James, Edward T., Janet Wilson James, Paul S. Boyer, Radcliffe College. Notable American Women, 1607–1950: A Biographical Dictionary. Belknap Press of Harvard University Press, 1971. .
Janik, Vicki K., Del Ivan Janik, Emmanuel S. Nelson. Modern British women writers: An A-to-Z guide. Greenwood Press, 2002. .
Kanner, Barbara. Women in context: Two hundred years of British women autobiographers, a reference guide and reader. G. K. Hall; Prentice Hall International, 1997. .
Kaptur, Marcy. Women of Congress: A twentieth-century odyssey. Congressional Quarterly, 1996. .
Keith-Smith, Brian. An encyclopedia of German women writers, 1900–1933: Biographies and bibliographies with exemplary readings. E. Mellen Press, c1997–c1998. .
Kersey, Ethel M., Calvin O. Schrag. Women philosophers: a bio-critical source book. Greenwood Press, 1989. .
Kőhler-Lutterbeck, Monika Siedentopf. Lexikon der 1000 Frauen. Dietz, 2000. . (German).
Kort, Carol, Liz Sonneborn. A to Z of American women in the visual arts. Facts on File, 2002. .
Krisman, Carol. Encyclopedia of American women in business: from colonial times to the present. Greenwood Press, 2005. .
Kuhlman, Erika A. A to Z of women in world history. Facts on File, 2002. .
Kuiper, Kathleen. The 100 most influential women of all time. Britannica Educational Pub. : Rosen Educational Services, 2010. .
Larsen, Jytte, Grethe Ilsøe, Hanne Rimmen. Dansk kvindebiografisk leksikon. Rosinante, 2000. .
Law, Cheryl. Women, a modern political dictionary. I.B. Tauris, 2000. .
Lee, Lily Xiao Hong, A. D. Stefanowska, Sue Wiles. Biographical dictionary of Chinese women. M. E. Sharpe, 1998–2007. .
Levin, Beatrice. Women and medicine. Scarecrow Press, 2002. .
Litoff, Judy Barrett, Judith McDonnell. European immigrant women in the United States: A biographical dictionary. Garland Publ., 1994. .
Macdonald, Charlotte, Merimeri Penfold, B. R. Williams. The book of New Zealand women (Ko kui ma te kaupapa.). B. Williams Books, 1991. .
Mainiero, Lina. American women writers: A critical reference guide from colonial times to the present. Ungar, c1979–1994. .
Marting, Diane E. Spanish American women writers: A bio-bibliographical source book. Greenwood Press, 1990. .
Marting, Diane E. Women writers of Spanish America: An annotated bio-bibliographical guide. Greenwood Press, 1987. .
Miller, Jane Eldridge. Who's who in contemporary women's writing. Routledge, 2002. .
O'Connell, Agnes N., Nancy Felipe Russo. Models of achievement: Reflections of eminent women in psychology. Columbia University Press, 1983–2001. .
O'Dea, Suzanne. From suffrage to the Senate: America's political women: an encyclopedia of leaders, causes & issues. Grey House Publ., 2013. .
O'Dea Schenken, Suzanne, Ann W. Richards. From suffrage to the Senate: An encyclopedia of American women in politics. ABC-CLIO, 1999. .

Opfell, Olga S. Women prime ministers and presidents. McFarland, 1993. .
Oppedisano, Jeannette M. Historical encyclopedia of American women entrepreneurs: 1776 to the present. Greenwood Press, 2000. .
Österberg, Carin, Inga Lewenhaupt, Anna-Greta Wahlberg. Svenska kvinnor: Föregångare, nyskapare. Signum, 1990. .
Palmer, María del Carmen Simón. Escritoras españolas del siglo XIX: Manual bio-bibliográfico. Castalia, 1991. .
Petteys, Chris. Dictionary of women artists: An international dictionary of women artists born before 1900. G.K. Hall, 1985. .
Pusch, Luise F. FemBio: Notable women international. Luise F. Pusch, 2006. Available online here.
Rappaport, Helen. Encyclopedia of women social reformers. ABC-CLIO, 2001. .
Rayner-Canham, Marelene F., Geoffrey Rayner-Canham. Women in chemistry: Their changing roles from alchemical times to the mid-twentieth century. American Chemical Society; Chemical Heritage Foundation, 1998. .
Riddle, Larry. Biographies of women mathematicians. Agnes Scott College. Available online here.
Robin, Diana Maury, Anne R. Larsen, Carole Levin. Encyclopedia of women in the Renaissance: Italy, France, and England. ABC-CLIO, 2007. .
Ruíz, Vicki, Virginia Sánchez Korrol. Latinas in the United States: A historical encyclopedia. Indiana University Press, 2006. .
Sadie, Julie Anne, Rhian Samuel. The Norton/Grove dictionary of women composers. W.W. Norton, 1994. .
Salisbury, Joyce E., Mary Lefkowitz. Encyclopedia of women in the ancient world. ABC-CLIO, 2001. .
Schlueter, Paul, June Schlueter. An encyclopedia of British women writers. Rutgers University Press, 1998. .
Schumaher, Schuma, Erico Vital Brazil. Dicionário mulheres do Brasil: De 1500 até a atualidade; Com 270 ilustrações. J. Zahar Editor, 2000. .
Scrivener, Laurice, J. Suzanne Barnes. A biographical dictionary of women healers: Midwives, nurses, and physicians. Oryx Press, 2002. .
Seller, Maxine. Women educators in the United States, 1820–1993: A bio-bibliographical sourcebook. Greenwood Press, 1994. .
Shattock, Joanne. The Oxford guide to British women writers. Oxford University Press, 1993. .
Shearer, Benjamin F., Barbara Smith Shearer. Notable women in the life sciences: a biographical dictionary. Greenwood Press, 1996. .
Sheldon, Kathleen E. Historical dictionary of women in sub-Saharan Africa. Scarecrow Press, 2005. .
Sherrow, Victoria. A to Z of American women business leaders and entrepreneurs. Facts on File, 2002. .
Showalter, Elaine, Lea Baechler, A. Walton Litz. Modern American women writers. Collier Books; Maxwell Macmillan Canada; Maxwell Macmillan International, 1993. .
Smith, Jessie Carney, Shirelle Phelps. Notable black American women. Gale Research, 1992–2003. .
Société Internationale pour l'Étude des Femmes de l'Ancien Régime. Dictionnaire des femmes de l'ancienne France. Société Internationale pour l'Étude des Femmes de l'Ancien Régime. Available online here.
Sweeney, Patricia E. Biographies of British women: An annotated bibliography. ABC-CLIO, 1993. .
Talhami, Ghada Hashem. Historical dictionary of women in the Middle East and North Africa. Scarecrow Press, 2013. .
Todd, Janet M. British women writers: A critical reference guide. Continuum, 1989. .
Todd, Janet M. A dictionary of British and American women writers, 1660–1800. Rowman and Allanheld, 1985. .
Uglow, Jennifer S., Frances Hinton, Maggy Hendry. The Palgrave Macmillan dictionary of women's biography. Palgrave Macmillan, 2005. .
Wedel, Gudrun. Autobiographien von Frauen: ein Lexikon. Böhlau, 2010. ; .
Welch, Rosanne. Encyclopedia of women in aviation and space. ABC-CLIO, 1998. .
Windsor, Laura Lynn. Women in medicine: An encyclopedia. ABC-CLIO, 2002. .

See also 
 Bibliography of encyclopedias
 Biographical dictionary

References

Bibliography 
Guide to Reference.  American Library Association. Retrieved 5 December 2014. (subscription required).
Kroeger, Alice Bertha, Isadore Gilbert Mudge. (1911). Guide to the Study and Use of Reference books. Chicago: American Library Association.

 
Bibliography of encyclopedias